

491001–491100 

|-bgcolor=#fefefe
| 491001 ||  || — || March 31, 2011 || Haleakala || Pan-STARRS || — || align=right data-sort-value="0.73" | 730 m || 
|-id=002 bgcolor=#d6d6d6
| 491002 ||  || — || November 17, 2008 || Kitt Peak || Spacewatch || — || align=right | 3.5 km || 
|-id=003 bgcolor=#d6d6d6
| 491003 ||  || — || April 3, 2011 || Haleakala || Pan-STARRS || VER || align=right | 2.9 km || 
|-id=004 bgcolor=#d6d6d6
| 491004 ||  || — || April 3, 2011 || Haleakala || Pan-STARRS || — || align=right | 2.9 km || 
|-id=005 bgcolor=#d6d6d6
| 491005 ||  || — || February 1, 2005 || Catalina || CSS || EOS || align=right | 2.9 km || 
|-id=006 bgcolor=#d6d6d6
| 491006 ||  || — || August 14, 2007 || Siding Spring || SSS || — || align=right | 4.3 km || 
|-id=007 bgcolor=#FFC2E0
| 491007 ||  || — || April 13, 2011 || Catalina || CSS || APO || align=right data-sort-value="0.44" | 440 m || 
|-id=008 bgcolor=#d6d6d6
| 491008 ||  || — || May 8, 2006 || Mount Lemmon || Mount Lemmon Survey || — || align=right | 3.1 km || 
|-id=009 bgcolor=#d6d6d6
| 491009 ||  || — || March 26, 2011 || Mount Lemmon || Mount Lemmon Survey || — || align=right | 3.7 km || 
|-id=010 bgcolor=#fefefe
| 491010 ||  || — || March 29, 2011 || Kitt Peak || Spacewatch || — || align=right data-sort-value="0.54" | 540 m || 
|-id=011 bgcolor=#d6d6d6
| 491011 ||  || — || March 27, 2011 || Mount Lemmon || Mount Lemmon Survey || — || align=right | 2.7 km || 
|-id=012 bgcolor=#E9E9E9
| 491012 ||  || — || May 24, 2011 || Haleakala || Pan-STARRS || — || align=right | 1.5 km || 
|-id=013 bgcolor=#E9E9E9
| 491013 ||  || — || May 24, 2011 || Haleakala || Pan-STARRS || — || align=right | 1.2 km || 
|-id=014 bgcolor=#d6d6d6
| 491014 ||  || — || May 24, 2011 || Haleakala || Pan-STARRS || — || align=right | 2.7 km || 
|-id=015 bgcolor=#FA8072
| 491015 ||  || — || September 23, 2008 || Kitt Peak || Spacewatch || — || align=right data-sort-value="0.47" | 470 m || 
|-id=016 bgcolor=#E9E9E9
| 491016 ||  || — || July 1, 2011 || Haleakala || Pan-STARRS || — || align=right data-sort-value="0.99" | 990 m || 
|-id=017 bgcolor=#fefefe
| 491017 ||  || — || July 22, 2011 || Haleakala || Pan-STARRS || — || align=right data-sort-value="0.85" | 850 m || 
|-id=018 bgcolor=#fefefe
| 491018 ||  || — || July 22, 2011 || Haleakala || Pan-STARRS || — || align=right data-sort-value="0.78" | 780 m || 
|-id=019 bgcolor=#d6d6d6
| 491019 ||  || — || December 10, 2004 || Kitt Peak || Spacewatch || (6124)3:2 || align=right | 3.1 km || 
|-id=020 bgcolor=#fefefe
| 491020 ||  || — || October 1, 2005 || Kitt Peak || Spacewatch || — || align=right data-sort-value="0.53" | 530 m || 
|-id=021 bgcolor=#fefefe
| 491021 ||  || — || July 25, 2011 || Haleakala || Pan-STARRS || — || align=right data-sort-value="0.80" | 800 m || 
|-id=022 bgcolor=#fefefe
| 491022 ||  || — || July 26, 2011 || Haleakala || Pan-STARRS || — || align=right data-sort-value="0.78" | 780 m || 
|-id=023 bgcolor=#fefefe
| 491023 ||  || — || June 3, 2011 || Mount Lemmon || Mount Lemmon Survey || — || align=right data-sort-value="0.65" | 650 m || 
|-id=024 bgcolor=#fefefe
| 491024 ||  || — || November 25, 2005 || Mount Lemmon || Mount Lemmon Survey || — || align=right data-sort-value="0.51" | 510 m || 
|-id=025 bgcolor=#d6d6d6
| 491025 ||  || — || July 22, 2011 || Haleakala || Pan-STARRS || — || align=right | 3.0 km || 
|-id=026 bgcolor=#fefefe
| 491026 ||  || — || August 4, 2011 || Haleakala || Pan-STARRS || — || align=right data-sort-value="0.65" | 650 m || 
|-id=027 bgcolor=#fefefe
| 491027 ||  || — || October 21, 2008 || Kitt Peak || Spacewatch || — || align=right data-sort-value="0.61" | 610 m || 
|-id=028 bgcolor=#fefefe
| 491028 ||  || — || August 6, 2011 || Haleakala || Pan-STARRS || — || align=right data-sort-value="0.80" | 800 m || 
|-id=029 bgcolor=#d6d6d6
| 491029 ||  || — || August 9, 2011 || Haleakala || Pan-STARRS || — || align=right | 2.1 km || 
|-id=030 bgcolor=#d6d6d6
| 491030 ||  || — || August 9, 2011 || Haleakala || Pan-STARRS || 3:2 || align=right | 3.8 km || 
|-id=031 bgcolor=#fefefe
| 491031 ||  || — || August 19, 2011 || Haleakala || Pan-STARRS || NYS || align=right data-sort-value="0.49" | 490 m || 
|-id=032 bgcolor=#fefefe
| 491032 ||  || — || June 8, 2011 || Mount Lemmon || Mount Lemmon Survey || — || align=right data-sort-value="0.69" | 690 m || 
|-id=033 bgcolor=#C2FFFF
| 491033 ||  || — || August 4, 2011 || Haleakala || Pan-STARRS || L5 || align=right | 7.3 km || 
|-id=034 bgcolor=#fefefe
| 491034 ||  || — || July 28, 2011 || Haleakala || Pan-STARRS || — || align=right data-sort-value="0.74" | 740 m || 
|-id=035 bgcolor=#d6d6d6
| 491035 ||  || — || July 25, 2011 || Haleakala || Pan-STARRS || — || align=right | 2.9 km || 
|-id=036 bgcolor=#fefefe
| 491036 ||  || — || August 20, 2011 || Haleakala || Pan-STARRS || — || align=right data-sort-value="0.68" | 680 m || 
|-id=037 bgcolor=#FA8072
| 491037 ||  || — || August 23, 2011 || La Sagra || OAM Obs. || critical || align=right data-sort-value="0.57" | 570 m || 
|-id=038 bgcolor=#fefefe
| 491038 ||  || — || August 21, 2011 || La Sagra || OAM Obs. || — || align=right data-sort-value="0.87" | 870 m || 
|-id=039 bgcolor=#fefefe
| 491039 ||  || — || August 23, 2011 || Haleakala || Pan-STARRS || — || align=right data-sort-value="0.65" | 650 m || 
|-id=040 bgcolor=#E9E9E9
| 491040 ||  || — || August 20, 2011 || Haleakala || Pan-STARRS || — || align=right | 2.3 km || 
|-id=041 bgcolor=#d6d6d6
| 491041 ||  || — || August 4, 2011 || La Sagra || OAM Obs. || — || align=right | 3.2 km || 
|-id=042 bgcolor=#fefefe
| 491042 ||  || — || August 24, 2011 || Haleakala || Pan-STARRS || V || align=right data-sort-value="0.54" | 540 m || 
|-id=043 bgcolor=#E9E9E9
| 491043 ||  || — || August 10, 2011 || Haleakala || Pan-STARRS || — || align=right | 2.0 km || 
|-id=044 bgcolor=#fefefe
| 491044 ||  || — || August 21, 2011 || La Sagra || OAM Obs. || — || align=right data-sort-value="0.70" | 700 m || 
|-id=045 bgcolor=#d6d6d6
| 491045 ||  || — || August 24, 2011 || Haleakala || Pan-STARRS || 3:2 || align=right | 3.8 km || 
|-id=046 bgcolor=#fefefe
| 491046 ||  || — || January 20, 2009 || Mount Lemmon || Mount Lemmon Survey || — || align=right data-sort-value="0.93" | 930 m || 
|-id=047 bgcolor=#d6d6d6
| 491047 ||  || — || October 28, 2006 || Mount Lemmon || Mount Lemmon Survey || THM || align=right | 2.4 km || 
|-id=048 bgcolor=#fefefe
| 491048 ||  || — || November 7, 2008 || Mount Lemmon || Mount Lemmon Survey || — || align=right data-sort-value="0.70" | 700 m || 
|-id=049 bgcolor=#fefefe
| 491049 ||  || — || October 30, 2008 || Kitt Peak || Spacewatch || V || align=right data-sort-value="0.77" | 770 m || 
|-id=050 bgcolor=#fefefe
| 491050 ||  || — || August 28, 2011 || Haleakala || Pan-STARRS || — || align=right data-sort-value="0.72" | 720 m || 
|-id=051 bgcolor=#fefefe
| 491051 ||  || — || August 22, 2011 || La Sagra || OAM Obs. || — || align=right data-sort-value="0.65" | 650 m || 
|-id=052 bgcolor=#E9E9E9
| 491052 ||  || — || August 23, 2011 || Haleakala || Pan-STARRS || — || align=right | 1.8 km || 
|-id=053 bgcolor=#d6d6d6
| 491053 ||  || — || July 7, 2005 || Kitt Peak || Spacewatch || — || align=right | 2.3 km || 
|-id=054 bgcolor=#E9E9E9
| 491054 ||  || — || August 30, 2011 || Haleakala || Pan-STARRS || — || align=right | 1.7 km || 
|-id=055 bgcolor=#d6d6d6
| 491055 ||  || — || August 31, 2011 || Haleakala || Pan-STARRS || 3:2 || align=right | 5.2 km || 
|-id=056 bgcolor=#fefefe
| 491056 ||  || — || February 13, 2010 || Kitt Peak || Spacewatch || V || align=right data-sort-value="0.54" | 540 m || 
|-id=057 bgcolor=#d6d6d6
| 491057 ||  || — || August 23, 2011 || Haleakala || Pan-STARRS || — || align=right | 3.5 km || 
|-id=058 bgcolor=#d6d6d6
| 491058 ||  || — || September 27, 2000 || Socorro || LINEAR || LIX || align=right | 3.7 km || 
|-id=059 bgcolor=#fefefe
| 491059 ||  || — || August 24, 2011 || La Sagra || OAM Obs. || — || align=right data-sort-value="0.74" | 740 m || 
|-id=060 bgcolor=#fefefe
| 491060 ||  || — || July 30, 2011 || Siding Spring || SSS || — || align=right | 1.1 km || 
|-id=061 bgcolor=#E9E9E9
| 491061 ||  || — || August 24, 2011 || Haleakala || Pan-STARRS || — || align=right | 1.9 km || 
|-id=062 bgcolor=#fefefe
| 491062 ||  || — || August 24, 2000 || Socorro || LINEAR || ERI || align=right | 1.5 km || 
|-id=063 bgcolor=#fefefe
| 491063 ||  || — || August 31, 2011 || La Sagra || OAM Obs. || — || align=right data-sort-value="0.86" | 860 m || 
|-id=064 bgcolor=#fefefe
| 491064 ||  || — || October 9, 2004 || Kitt Peak || Spacewatch || NYS || align=right data-sort-value="0.50" | 500 m || 
|-id=065 bgcolor=#E9E9E9
| 491065 ||  || — || August 24, 2011 || Haleakala || Pan-STARRS || — || align=right | 2.4 km || 
|-id=066 bgcolor=#d6d6d6
| 491066 ||  || — || March 22, 2009 || Mount Lemmon || Mount Lemmon Survey || VER || align=right | 2.6 km || 
|-id=067 bgcolor=#C2FFFF
| 491067 ||  || — || August 9, 2011 || Haleakala || Pan-STARRS || L5 || align=right | 7.7 km || 
|-id=068 bgcolor=#fefefe
| 491068 ||  || — || March 13, 2007 || Kitt Peak || Spacewatch || — || align=right data-sort-value="0.62" | 620 m || 
|-id=069 bgcolor=#d6d6d6
| 491069 ||  || — || August 30, 2011 || Haleakala || Pan-STARRS || VER || align=right | 2.4 km || 
|-id=070 bgcolor=#fefefe
| 491070 ||  || — || October 13, 2001 || Socorro || LINEAR || — || align=right data-sort-value="0.63" | 630 m || 
|-id=071 bgcolor=#fefefe
| 491071 ||  || — || August 24, 2011 || La Sagra || OAM Obs. || — || align=right data-sort-value="0.72" | 720 m || 
|-id=072 bgcolor=#d6d6d6
| 491072 ||  || — || November 12, 2006 || Mount Lemmon || Mount Lemmon Survey || — || align=right | 2.5 km || 
|-id=073 bgcolor=#fefefe
| 491073 ||  || — || February 19, 2010 || Mount Lemmon || Mount Lemmon Survey || — || align=right data-sort-value="0.59" | 590 m || 
|-id=074 bgcolor=#d6d6d6
| 491074 ||  || — || August 23, 2011 || Haleakala || Pan-STARRS || — || align=right | 2.6 km || 
|-id=075 bgcolor=#d6d6d6
| 491075 ||  || — || August 20, 2011 || Haleakala || Pan-STARRS || — || align=right | 2.0 km || 
|-id=076 bgcolor=#fefefe
| 491076 ||  || — || October 15, 2004 || Anderson Mesa || LONEOS || — || align=right data-sort-value="0.63" | 630 m || 
|-id=077 bgcolor=#fefefe
| 491077 ||  || — || September 4, 2011 || Haleakala || Pan-STARRS || — || align=right data-sort-value="0.75" | 750 m || 
|-id=078 bgcolor=#E9E9E9
| 491078 ||  || — || September 5, 2011 || Haleakala || Pan-STARRS || — || align=right | 1.7 km || 
|-id=079 bgcolor=#d6d6d6
| 491079 ||  || — || September 30, 2006 || Kitt Peak || Spacewatch || — || align=right | 2.2 km || 
|-id=080 bgcolor=#E9E9E9
| 491080 ||  || — || September 4, 2011 || Haleakala || Pan-STARRS || MRX || align=right data-sort-value="0.92" | 920 m || 
|-id=081 bgcolor=#d6d6d6
| 491081 ||  || — || September 5, 2011 || Haleakala || Pan-STARRS || — || align=right | 2.6 km || 
|-id=082 bgcolor=#fefefe
| 491082 ||  || — || September 2, 2011 || Haleakala || Pan-STARRS || — || align=right data-sort-value="0.90" | 900 m || 
|-id=083 bgcolor=#fefefe
| 491083 ||  || — || September 17, 2011 || La Sagra || OAM Obs. || — || align=right | 1.1 km || 
|-id=084 bgcolor=#fefefe
| 491084 ||  || — || August 26, 2011 || Haleakala || Pan-STARRS || — || align=right data-sort-value="0.56" | 560 m || 
|-id=085 bgcolor=#fefefe
| 491085 ||  || — || August 31, 2011 || Haleakala || Pan-STARRS || — || align=right data-sort-value="0.89" | 890 m || 
|-id=086 bgcolor=#E9E9E9
| 491086 ||  || — || September 25, 1998 || Anderson Mesa || LONEOS || — || align=right | 1.4 km || 
|-id=087 bgcolor=#E9E9E9
| 491087 ||  || — || September 4, 2011 || Haleakala || Pan-STARRS || — || align=right | 1.8 km || 
|-id=088 bgcolor=#E9E9E9
| 491088 ||  || — || September 19, 2011 || Mount Lemmon || Mount Lemmon Survey || — || align=right | 1.5 km || 
|-id=089 bgcolor=#fefefe
| 491089 ||  || — || September 4, 2011 || Haleakala || Pan-STARRS || — || align=right data-sort-value="0.78" | 780 m || 
|-id=090 bgcolor=#FA8072
| 491090 ||  || — || September 19, 2011 || Haleakala || Pan-STARRS || — || align=right data-sort-value="0.39" | 390 m || 
|-id=091 bgcolor=#fefefe
| 491091 ||  || — || September 2, 2011 || Haleakala || Pan-STARRS || — || align=right data-sort-value="0.88" | 880 m || 
|-id=092 bgcolor=#E9E9E9
| 491092 ||  || — || September 20, 2011 || Haleakala || Pan-STARRS || — || align=right | 1.5 km || 
|-id=093 bgcolor=#d6d6d6
| 491093 ||  || — || October 21, 2006 || Mount Lemmon || Mount Lemmon Survey || THB || align=right | 2.5 km || 
|-id=094 bgcolor=#E9E9E9
| 491094 ||  || — || June 13, 2011 || Mount Lemmon || Mount Lemmon Survey || — || align=right | 2.5 km || 
|-id=095 bgcolor=#d6d6d6
| 491095 ||  || — || September 20, 2011 || La Sagra || OAM Obs. || — || align=right | 3.2 km || 
|-id=096 bgcolor=#fefefe
| 491096 ||  || — || October 13, 2004 || Kitt Peak || Spacewatch || — || align=right data-sort-value="0.87" | 870 m || 
|-id=097 bgcolor=#d6d6d6
| 491097 ||  || — || September 19, 2011 || Haleakala || Pan-STARRS || EOS || align=right | 2.2 km || 
|-id=098 bgcolor=#fefefe
| 491098 ||  || — || August 25, 2011 || La Sagra || OAM Obs. || — || align=right data-sort-value="0.75" | 750 m || 
|-id=099 bgcolor=#E9E9E9
| 491099 ||  || — || September 18, 2011 || La Sagra || OAM Obs. || — || align=right | 3.0 km || 
|-id=100 bgcolor=#fefefe
| 491100 ||  || — || January 31, 2006 || Kitt Peak || Spacewatch || V || align=right data-sort-value="0.71" | 710 m || 
|}

491101–491200 

|-bgcolor=#fefefe
| 491101 ||  || — || March 24, 2003 || Kitt Peak || Spacewatch || — || align=right data-sort-value="0.86" | 860 m || 
|-id=102 bgcolor=#E9E9E9
| 491102 ||  || — || October 11, 2007 || Kitt Peak || Spacewatch || — || align=right data-sort-value="0.89" | 890 m || 
|-id=103 bgcolor=#d6d6d6
| 491103 ||  || — || October 27, 2006 || Mount Lemmon || Mount Lemmon Survey || — || align=right | 1.7 km || 
|-id=104 bgcolor=#fefefe
| 491104 ||  || — || June 27, 2011 || Mount Lemmon || Mount Lemmon Survey || — || align=right data-sort-value="0.74" | 740 m || 
|-id=105 bgcolor=#fefefe
| 491105 ||  || — || September 2, 2011 || Haleakala || Pan-STARRS || critical || align=right data-sort-value="0.59" | 590 m || 
|-id=106 bgcolor=#fefefe
| 491106 ||  || — || October 27, 2008 || Kitt Peak || Spacewatch || — || align=right data-sort-value="0.51" | 510 m || 
|-id=107 bgcolor=#E9E9E9
| 491107 ||  || — || September 20, 2011 || Catalina || CSS || — || align=right | 1.1 km || 
|-id=108 bgcolor=#fefefe
| 491108 ||  || — || September 20, 2011 || Haleakala || Pan-STARRS || — || align=right data-sort-value="0.76" | 760 m || 
|-id=109 bgcolor=#fefefe
| 491109 ||  || — || November 24, 1997 || Kitt Peak || Spacewatch || — || align=right data-sort-value="0.80" | 800 m || 
|-id=110 bgcolor=#E9E9E9
| 491110 ||  || — || November 14, 2007 || Kitt Peak || Spacewatch || JUN || align=right data-sort-value="0.81" | 810 m || 
|-id=111 bgcolor=#fefefe
| 491111 ||  || — || October 27, 2008 || Mount Lemmon || Mount Lemmon Survey || — || align=right data-sort-value="0.53" | 530 m || 
|-id=112 bgcolor=#d6d6d6
| 491112 ||  || — || October 19, 1995 || Kitt Peak || Spacewatch || critical || align=right | 1.3 km || 
|-id=113 bgcolor=#E9E9E9
| 491113 ||  || — || October 21, 2007 || Catalina || CSS || EUN || align=right data-sort-value="0.86" | 860 m || 
|-id=114 bgcolor=#fefefe
| 491114 ||  || — || September 21, 2011 || Kitt Peak || Spacewatch || — || align=right data-sort-value="0.85" | 850 m || 
|-id=115 bgcolor=#d6d6d6
| 491115 ||  || — || October 22, 2006 || Mount Lemmon || Mount Lemmon Survey || — || align=right | 3.6 km || 
|-id=116 bgcolor=#E9E9E9
| 491116 ||  || — || September 4, 2011 || Haleakala || Pan-STARRS || — || align=right | 2.3 km || 
|-id=117 bgcolor=#d6d6d6
| 491117 ||  || — || November 24, 2006 || Kitt Peak || Spacewatch || THM || align=right | 1.6 km || 
|-id=118 bgcolor=#d6d6d6
| 491118 ||  || — || August 24, 2011 || Haleakala || Pan-STARRS || — || align=right | 2.4 km || 
|-id=119 bgcolor=#E9E9E9
| 491119 ||  || — || August 27, 2011 || Haleakala || Pan-STARRS || — || align=right | 2.4 km || 
|-id=120 bgcolor=#d6d6d6
| 491120 ||  || — || February 9, 2008 || Kitt Peak || Spacewatch || EOS || align=right | 1.5 km || 
|-id=121 bgcolor=#E9E9E9
| 491121 ||  || — || September 15, 2007 || Mount Lemmon || Mount Lemmon Survey || (5) || align=right data-sort-value="0.63" | 630 m || 
|-id=122 bgcolor=#fefefe
| 491122 ||  || — || June 9, 2011 || Haleakala || Pan-STARRS || — || align=right | 1.0 km || 
|-id=123 bgcolor=#fefefe
| 491123 ||  || — || August 25, 2011 || La Sagra || OAM Obs. || — || align=right | 1.0 km || 
|-id=124 bgcolor=#E9E9E9
| 491124 ||  || — || September 18, 2011 || Mount Lemmon || Mount Lemmon Survey || EUN || align=right data-sort-value="0.88" | 880 m || 
|-id=125 bgcolor=#fefefe
| 491125 ||  || — || August 26, 2011 || Kitt Peak || Spacewatch || — || align=right data-sort-value="0.78" | 780 m || 
|-id=126 bgcolor=#fefefe
| 491126 ||  || — || July 1, 2011 || Haleakala || Pan-STARRS || — || align=right | 1.0 km || 
|-id=127 bgcolor=#E9E9E9
| 491127 ||  || — || November 2, 2007 || Kitt Peak || Spacewatch || critical || align=right data-sort-value="0.92" | 920 m || 
|-id=128 bgcolor=#d6d6d6
| 491128 ||  || — || March 2, 2008 || Mount Lemmon || Mount Lemmon Survey || — || align=right | 2.2 km || 
|-id=129 bgcolor=#E9E9E9
| 491129 ||  || — || September 23, 2011 || Haleakala || Pan-STARRS || — || align=right | 1.8 km || 
|-id=130 bgcolor=#fefefe
| 491130 ||  || — || September 23, 2011 || Kitt Peak || Spacewatch || — || align=right data-sort-value="0.71" | 710 m || 
|-id=131 bgcolor=#d6d6d6
| 491131 ||  || — || September 28, 2006 || Mount Lemmon || Mount Lemmon Survey || — || align=right | 2.0 km || 
|-id=132 bgcolor=#E9E9E9
| 491132 ||  || — || November 5, 2007 || Kitt Peak || Spacewatch || — || align=right data-sort-value="0.86" | 860 m || 
|-id=133 bgcolor=#E9E9E9
| 491133 ||  || — || September 20, 2011 || Kitt Peak || Spacewatch || NEM || align=right | 1.8 km || 
|-id=134 bgcolor=#d6d6d6
| 491134 ||  || — || September 21, 2011 || Kitt Peak || Spacewatch || — || align=right | 2.0 km || 
|-id=135 bgcolor=#d6d6d6
| 491135 ||  || — || September 27, 2003 || Kitt Peak || Spacewatch || SHU3:2 || align=right | 5.0 km || 
|-id=136 bgcolor=#E9E9E9
| 491136 ||  || — || September 26, 2011 || Haleakala || Pan-STARRS || — || align=right | 1.9 km || 
|-id=137 bgcolor=#d6d6d6
| 491137 ||  || — || October 2, 2006 || Mount Lemmon || Mount Lemmon Survey || — || align=right | 1.8 km || 
|-id=138 bgcolor=#E9E9E9
| 491138 ||  || — || September 26, 2011 || Haleakala || Pan-STARRS || — || align=right | 1.5 km || 
|-id=139 bgcolor=#d6d6d6
| 491139 ||  || — || September 23, 2011 || Haleakala || Pan-STARRS || THMcritical || align=right | 1.7 km || 
|-id=140 bgcolor=#d6d6d6
| 491140 ||  || — || September 18, 2011 || Mount Lemmon || Mount Lemmon Survey || — || align=right | 2.6 km || 
|-id=141 bgcolor=#E9E9E9
| 491141 ||  || — || September 4, 2011 || Haleakala || Pan-STARRS || — || align=right data-sort-value="0.77" | 770 m || 
|-id=142 bgcolor=#fefefe
| 491142 ||  || — || June 23, 2007 || Kitt Peak || Spacewatch || — || align=right data-sort-value="0.71" | 710 m || 
|-id=143 bgcolor=#E9E9E9
| 491143 ||  || — || October 20, 2007 || Mount Lemmon || Mount Lemmon Survey || — || align=right data-sort-value="0.78" | 780 m || 
|-id=144 bgcolor=#fefefe
| 491144 ||  || — || September 26, 2011 || Kitt Peak || Spacewatch || — || align=right data-sort-value="0.63" | 630 m || 
|-id=145 bgcolor=#fefefe
| 491145 ||  || — || November 11, 2007 || Mount Lemmon || Mount Lemmon Survey || — || align=right data-sort-value="0.66" | 660 m || 
|-id=146 bgcolor=#fefefe
| 491146 ||  || — || September 10, 2004 || Socorro || LINEAR || — || align=right data-sort-value="0.62" | 620 m || 
|-id=147 bgcolor=#d6d6d6
| 491147 ||  || — || October 27, 2006 || Mount Lemmon || Mount Lemmon Survey || — || align=right | 2.2 km || 
|-id=148 bgcolor=#fefefe
| 491148 ||  || — || January 1, 2009 || Mount Lemmon || Mount Lemmon Survey || NYS || align=right data-sort-value="0.67" | 670 m || 
|-id=149 bgcolor=#fefefe
| 491149 ||  || — || September 29, 2011 || Mount Lemmon || Mount Lemmon Survey || — || align=right | 1.0 km || 
|-id=150 bgcolor=#E9E9E9
| 491150 ||  || — || September 25, 2011 || Haleakala || Pan-STARRS || — || align=right | 1.1 km || 
|-id=151 bgcolor=#fefefe
| 491151 ||  || — || September 8, 2011 || Kitt Peak || Spacewatch || — || align=right data-sort-value="0.84" | 840 m || 
|-id=152 bgcolor=#fefefe
| 491152 ||  || — || September 2, 2011 || Haleakala || Pan-STARRS || — || align=right data-sort-value="0.62" | 620 m || 
|-id=153 bgcolor=#d6d6d6
| 491153 ||  || — || October 4, 2006 || Mount Lemmon || Mount Lemmon Survey || — || align=right | 2.5 km || 
|-id=154 bgcolor=#fefefe
| 491154 ||  || — || August 30, 2011 || Haleakala || Pan-STARRS || — || align=right data-sort-value="0.92" | 920 m || 
|-id=155 bgcolor=#fefefe
| 491155 ||  || — || August 23, 2011 || Haleakala || Pan-STARRS || — || align=right data-sort-value="0.68" | 680 m || 
|-id=156 bgcolor=#fefefe
| 491156 ||  || — || November 11, 2004 || Anderson Mesa || LONEOS || — || align=right | 1.3 km || 
|-id=157 bgcolor=#C2FFFF
| 491157 ||  || — || May 8, 2010 || WISE || WISE || L5 || align=right | 9.7 km || 
|-id=158 bgcolor=#d6d6d6
| 491158 ||  || — || November 16, 2006 || Kitt Peak || Spacewatch || — || align=right | 2.1 km || 
|-id=159 bgcolor=#fefefe
| 491159 ||  || — || October 4, 2007 || Mount Lemmon || Mount Lemmon Survey || — || align=right data-sort-value="0.84" | 840 m || 
|-id=160 bgcolor=#fefefe
| 491160 ||  || — || August 10, 2007 || Kitt Peak || Spacewatch || — || align=right data-sort-value="0.52" | 520 m || 
|-id=161 bgcolor=#fefefe
| 491161 ||  || — || April 18, 2007 || Kitt Peak || Spacewatch || — || align=right data-sort-value="0.69" | 690 m || 
|-id=162 bgcolor=#fefefe
| 491162 ||  || — || October 7, 2004 || Kitt Peak || Spacewatch || — || align=right data-sort-value="0.84" | 840 m || 
|-id=163 bgcolor=#E9E9E9
| 491163 ||  || — || September 26, 2011 || Haleakala || Pan-STARRS || AGN || align=right | 1.2 km || 
|-id=164 bgcolor=#fefefe
| 491164 ||  || — || September 21, 2011 || Catalina || CSS || — || align=right data-sort-value="0.71" | 710 m || 
|-id=165 bgcolor=#d6d6d6
| 491165 ||  || — || May 20, 2005 || Mount Lemmon || Mount Lemmon Survey || — || align=right | 3.0 km || 
|-id=166 bgcolor=#d6d6d6
| 491166 ||  || — || October 24, 1995 || Kitt Peak || Spacewatch || — || align=right | 1.8 km || 
|-id=167 bgcolor=#d6d6d6
| 491167 ||  || — || October 4, 2011 || La Sagra || OAM Obs. || — || align=right | 3.4 km || 
|-id=168 bgcolor=#E9E9E9
| 491168 ||  || — || October 6, 2011 || La Sagra || OAM Obs. || — || align=right | 1.0 km || 
|-id=169 bgcolor=#fefefe
| 491169 ||  || — || August 25, 2004 || Kitt Peak || Spacewatch || — || align=right data-sort-value="0.69" | 690 m || 
|-id=170 bgcolor=#d6d6d6
| 491170 ||  || — || October 7, 2011 || La Sagra || OAM Obs. || — || align=right | 3.6 km || 
|-id=171 bgcolor=#fefefe
| 491171 ||  || — || October 2, 2000 || Socorro || LINEAR || V || align=right data-sort-value="0.71" | 710 m || 
|-id=172 bgcolor=#E9E9E9
| 491172 ||  || — || November 9, 2007 || Kitt Peak || Spacewatch || — || align=right data-sort-value="0.79" | 790 m || 
|-id=173 bgcolor=#d6d6d6
| 491173 ||  || — || March 1, 2008 || Mount Lemmon || Mount Lemmon Survey || — || align=right | 2.5 km || 
|-id=174 bgcolor=#E9E9E9
| 491174 ||  || — || January 1, 2008 || Mount Lemmon || Mount Lemmon Survey || — || align=right | 1.4 km || 
|-id=175 bgcolor=#fefefe
| 491175 ||  || — || February 22, 2009 || Catalina || CSS || — || align=right data-sort-value="0.94" | 940 m || 
|-id=176 bgcolor=#E9E9E9
| 491176 ||  || — || October 1, 2011 || Kitt Peak || Spacewatch || — || align=right | 1.8 km || 
|-id=177 bgcolor=#E9E9E9
| 491177 ||  || — || October 17, 2011 || Kitt Peak || Spacewatch || — || align=right data-sort-value="0.96" | 960 m || 
|-id=178 bgcolor=#E9E9E9
| 491178 ||  || — || August 21, 2006 || Kitt Peak || Spacewatch || — || align=right | 2.0 km || 
|-id=179 bgcolor=#d6d6d6
| 491179 ||  || — || October 1, 2011 || Kitt Peak || Spacewatch || — || align=right | 3.4 km || 
|-id=180 bgcolor=#E9E9E9
| 491180 ||  || — || October 18, 2011 || Kitt Peak || Spacewatch || — || align=right | 1.1 km || 
|-id=181 bgcolor=#fefefe
| 491181 ||  || — || November 27, 2000 || Kitt Peak || Spacewatch || NYS || align=right data-sort-value="0.69" | 690 m || 
|-id=182 bgcolor=#fefefe
| 491182 ||  || — || September 3, 2007 || Catalina || CSS || — || align=right data-sort-value="0.77" | 770 m || 
|-id=183 bgcolor=#E9E9E9
| 491183 ||  || — || October 18, 2011 || Mount Lemmon || Mount Lemmon Survey || — || align=right data-sort-value="0.74" | 740 m || 
|-id=184 bgcolor=#d6d6d6
| 491184 ||  || — || September 8, 2011 || La Sagra || OAM Obs. || Tj (2.98) || align=right | 4.0 km || 
|-id=185 bgcolor=#d6d6d6
| 491185 ||  || — || December 16, 2006 || Kitt Peak || Spacewatch || THM || align=right | 1.9 km || 
|-id=186 bgcolor=#fefefe
| 491186 ||  || — || March 18, 2010 || Kitt Peak || Spacewatch || — || align=right data-sort-value="0.73" | 730 m || 
|-id=187 bgcolor=#d6d6d6
| 491187 ||  || — || September 23, 2000 || Socorro || LINEAR || — || align=right | 2.9 km || 
|-id=188 bgcolor=#E9E9E9
| 491188 ||  || — || October 21, 2011 || Mount Lemmon || Mount Lemmon Survey || — || align=right | 1.9 km || 
|-id=189 bgcolor=#E9E9E9
| 491189 ||  || — || October 7, 2007 || Kitt Peak || Spacewatch || — || align=right data-sort-value="0.78" | 780 m || 
|-id=190 bgcolor=#d6d6d6
| 491190 ||  || — || September 27, 2000 || Socorro || LINEAR || — || align=right | 2.4 km || 
|-id=191 bgcolor=#E9E9E9
| 491191 ||  || — || October 19, 2011 || Kitt Peak || Spacewatch || — || align=right | 1.3 km || 
|-id=192 bgcolor=#E9E9E9
| 491192 ||  || — || October 20, 2011 || Mount Lemmon || Mount Lemmon Survey || — || align=right data-sort-value="0.98" | 980 m || 
|-id=193 bgcolor=#E9E9E9
| 491193 ||  || — || October 21, 2011 || Mount Lemmon || Mount Lemmon Survey || EUN || align=right data-sort-value="0.98" | 980 m || 
|-id=194 bgcolor=#E9E9E9
| 491194 ||  || — || October 21, 2011 || Mount Lemmon || Mount Lemmon Survey || — || align=right | 1.3 km || 
|-id=195 bgcolor=#E9E9E9
| 491195 ||  || — || September 24, 2011 || Mount Lemmon || Mount Lemmon Survey || — || align=right | 1.4 km || 
|-id=196 bgcolor=#E9E9E9
| 491196 ||  || — || October 19, 2011 || Kitt Peak || Spacewatch || — || align=right | 1.0 km || 
|-id=197 bgcolor=#E9E9E9
| 491197 ||  || — || October 19, 2011 || Catalina || CSS || — || align=right | 1.4 km || 
|-id=198 bgcolor=#fefefe
| 491198 ||  || — || October 10, 2004 || Kitt Peak || Spacewatch || — || align=right data-sort-value="0.70" | 700 m || 
|-id=199 bgcolor=#fefefe
| 491199 ||  || — || September 16, 2004 || Socorro || LINEAR || — || align=right data-sort-value="0.95" | 950 m || 
|-id=200 bgcolor=#d6d6d6
| 491200 ||  || — || July 1, 2011 || Haleakala || Pan-STARRS || — || align=right | 3.4 km || 
|}

491201–491300 

|-bgcolor=#fefefe
| 491201 ||  || — || October 15, 2004 || Mount Lemmon || Mount Lemmon Survey || — || align=right data-sort-value="0.75" | 750 m || 
|-id=202 bgcolor=#fefefe
| 491202 ||  || — || December 12, 2004 || Kitt Peak || Spacewatch || — || align=right data-sort-value="0.95" | 950 m || 
|-id=203 bgcolor=#d6d6d6
| 491203 ||  || — || October 18, 2011 || Mount Lemmon || Mount Lemmon Survey || — || align=right | 2.3 km || 
|-id=204 bgcolor=#fefefe
| 491204 ||  || — || August 13, 2007 || XuYi || PMO NEO || — || align=right data-sort-value="0.98" | 980 m || 
|-id=205 bgcolor=#d6d6d6
| 491205 ||  || — || October 27, 2006 || Mount Lemmon || Mount Lemmon Survey || — || align=right | 1.8 km || 
|-id=206 bgcolor=#d6d6d6
| 491206 ||  || — || October 19, 2011 || Mount Lemmon || Mount Lemmon Survey || THM || align=right | 1.7 km || 
|-id=207 bgcolor=#fefefe
| 491207 ||  || — || September 25, 2011 || Haleakala || Pan-STARRS || — || align=right data-sort-value="0.82" | 820 m || 
|-id=208 bgcolor=#E9E9E9
| 491208 ||  || — || November 7, 2007 || Kitt Peak || Spacewatch || — || align=right data-sort-value="0.86" | 860 m || 
|-id=209 bgcolor=#E9E9E9
| 491209 ||  || — || October 19, 2011 || Kitt Peak || Spacewatch || — || align=right | 1.5 km || 
|-id=210 bgcolor=#E9E9E9
| 491210 ||  || — || September 24, 2011 || Mount Lemmon || Mount Lemmon Survey || (5) || align=right data-sort-value="0.67" | 670 m || 
|-id=211 bgcolor=#d6d6d6
| 491211 ||  || — || September 24, 2011 || Haleakala || Pan-STARRS || LIX || align=right | 3.7 km || 
|-id=212 bgcolor=#E9E9E9
| 491212 ||  || — || October 23, 2011 || Kitt Peak || Spacewatch || (5) || align=right data-sort-value="0.83" | 830 m || 
|-id=213 bgcolor=#fefefe
| 491213 ||  || — || October 18, 2007 || Kitt Peak || Spacewatch || — || align=right data-sort-value="0.86" | 860 m || 
|-id=214 bgcolor=#d6d6d6
| 491214 ||  || — || September 28, 2006 || Kitt Peak || Spacewatch || — || align=right | 1.9 km || 
|-id=215 bgcolor=#fefefe
| 491215 ||  || — || October 24, 2011 || Haleakala || Pan-STARRS || — || align=right data-sort-value="0.81" | 810 m || 
|-id=216 bgcolor=#E9E9E9
| 491216 ||  || — || September 27, 2011 || Mount Lemmon || Mount Lemmon Survey || — || align=right | 1.1 km || 
|-id=217 bgcolor=#d6d6d6
| 491217 ||  || — || October 23, 2011 || Haleakala || Pan-STARRS || — || align=right | 3.1 km || 
|-id=218 bgcolor=#E9E9E9
| 491218 ||  || — || September 21, 2011 || Kitt Peak || Spacewatch || — || align=right data-sort-value="0.94" | 940 m || 
|-id=219 bgcolor=#E9E9E9
| 491219 ||  || — || October 24, 2011 || Kitt Peak || Spacewatch || — || align=right | 1.6 km || 
|-id=220 bgcolor=#fefefe
| 491220 ||  || — || October 24, 2011 || Haleakala || Pan-STARRS || — || align=right | 1.0 km || 
|-id=221 bgcolor=#fefefe
| 491221 ||  || — || October 7, 2007 || Anderson Mesa || LONEOS || — || align=right data-sort-value="0.92" | 920 m || 
|-id=222 bgcolor=#d6d6d6
| 491222 ||  || — || October 20, 2011 || Mount Lemmon || Mount Lemmon Survey || — || align=right | 2.2 km || 
|-id=223 bgcolor=#d6d6d6
| 491223 ||  || — || October 25, 2011 || Haleakala || Pan-STARRS || — || align=right | 3.6 km || 
|-id=224 bgcolor=#d6d6d6
| 491224 ||  || — || October 25, 2011 || Haleakala || Pan-STARRS || EOS || align=right | 2.2 km || 
|-id=225 bgcolor=#E9E9E9
| 491225 ||  || — || October 25, 2011 || Haleakala || Pan-STARRS || — || align=right | 2.6 km || 
|-id=226 bgcolor=#fefefe
| 491226 ||  || — || October 25, 2011 || Haleakala || Pan-STARRS || — || align=right data-sort-value="0.98" | 980 m || 
|-id=227 bgcolor=#fefefe
| 491227 ||  || — || October 25, 2011 || Haleakala || Pan-STARRS || V || align=right data-sort-value="0.72" | 720 m || 
|-id=228 bgcolor=#d6d6d6
| 491228 ||  || — || October 25, 2011 || Haleakala || Pan-STARRS || — || align=right | 2.4 km || 
|-id=229 bgcolor=#E9E9E9
| 491229 ||  || — || November 13, 2007 || Mount Lemmon || Mount Lemmon Survey || — || align=right data-sort-value="0.74" | 740 m || 
|-id=230 bgcolor=#fefefe
| 491230 ||  || — || October 25, 2011 || Haleakala || Pan-STARRS || — || align=right data-sort-value="0.92" | 920 m || 
|-id=231 bgcolor=#d6d6d6
| 491231 ||  || — || September 24, 2011 || Haleakala || Pan-STARRS || — || align=right | 2.9 km || 
|-id=232 bgcolor=#fefefe
| 491232 ||  || — || September 12, 2007 || Catalina || CSS || — || align=right data-sort-value="0.79" | 790 m || 
|-id=233 bgcolor=#E9E9E9
| 491233 ||  || — || October 20, 2011 || Kitt Peak || Spacewatch || — || align=right | 1.2 km || 
|-id=234 bgcolor=#FA8072
| 491234 ||  || — || October 26, 2011 || Haleakala || Pan-STARRS || — || align=right data-sort-value="0.72" | 720 m || 
|-id=235 bgcolor=#fefefe
| 491235 ||  || — || October 7, 2007 || Catalina || CSS || — || align=right | 1.1 km || 
|-id=236 bgcolor=#E9E9E9
| 491236 ||  || — || October 25, 2011 || Haleakala || Pan-STARRS || — || align=right | 1.1 km || 
|-id=237 bgcolor=#d6d6d6
| 491237 ||  || — || October 25, 2011 || Haleakala || Pan-STARRS || — || align=right | 3.7 km || 
|-id=238 bgcolor=#fefefe
| 491238 ||  || — || April 24, 2007 || Kitt Peak || Spacewatch || — || align=right data-sort-value="0.75" | 750 m || 
|-id=239 bgcolor=#fefefe
| 491239 ||  || — || September 18, 2004 || Siding Spring || SSS || — || align=right | 1.0 km || 
|-id=240 bgcolor=#FA8072
| 491240 ||  || — || June 11, 2011 || Haleakala || Pan-STARRS || — || align=right data-sort-value="0.79" | 790 m || 
|-id=241 bgcolor=#E9E9E9
| 491241 ||  || — || October 19, 2011 || Kitt Peak || Spacewatch || — || align=right | 1.7 km || 
|-id=242 bgcolor=#E9E9E9
| 491242 ||  || — || September 23, 2011 || Haleakala || Pan-STARRS || — || align=right | 1.3 km || 
|-id=243 bgcolor=#d6d6d6
| 491243 ||  || — || September 26, 2011 || Kitt Peak || Spacewatch || — || align=right | 2.2 km || 
|-id=244 bgcolor=#fefefe
| 491244 ||  || — || October 4, 2004 || Kitt Peak || Spacewatch || — || align=right data-sort-value="0.57" | 570 m || 
|-id=245 bgcolor=#d6d6d6
| 491245 ||  || — || January 8, 2002 || Socorro || LINEAR || — || align=right | 2.7 km || 
|-id=246 bgcolor=#E9E9E9
| 491246 ||  || — || October 30, 2007 || Kitt Peak || Spacewatch || (5) || align=right data-sort-value="0.61" | 610 m || 
|-id=247 bgcolor=#fefefe
| 491247 ||  || — || September 23, 2011 || Haleakala || Pan-STARRS || NYS || align=right data-sort-value="0.67" | 670 m || 
|-id=248 bgcolor=#E9E9E9
| 491248 ||  || — || September 27, 2006 || Kitt Peak || Spacewatch || HOF || align=right | 2.3 km || 
|-id=249 bgcolor=#fefefe
| 491249 ||  || — || August 22, 2007 || Anderson Mesa || LONEOS || MAS || align=right data-sort-value="0.75" | 750 m || 
|-id=250 bgcolor=#E9E9E9
| 491250 ||  || — || April 24, 2010 || WISE || WISE || — || align=right | 1.3 km || 
|-id=251 bgcolor=#E9E9E9
| 491251 ||  || — || October 22, 2011 || Kitt Peak || Spacewatch || — || align=right data-sort-value="0.89" | 890 m || 
|-id=252 bgcolor=#d6d6d6
| 491252 ||  || — || October 18, 2011 || Kitt Peak || Spacewatch || — || align=right | 2.5 km || 
|-id=253 bgcolor=#d6d6d6
| 491253 ||  || — || September 24, 2000 || Socorro || LINEAR || — || align=right | 1.8 km || 
|-id=254 bgcolor=#fefefe
| 491254 ||  || — || September 24, 2011 || Mount Lemmon || Mount Lemmon Survey || — || align=right data-sort-value="0.59" | 590 m || 
|-id=255 bgcolor=#fefefe
| 491255 ||  || — || October 26, 2011 || Haleakala || Pan-STARRS || — || align=right data-sort-value="0.71" | 710 m || 
|-id=256 bgcolor=#E9E9E9
| 491256 ||  || — || October 26, 2011 || Haleakala || Pan-STARRS || critical || align=right | 1.3 km || 
|-id=257 bgcolor=#E9E9E9
| 491257 ||  || — || October 26, 2011 || Haleakala || Pan-STARRS || — || align=right | 1.2 km || 
|-id=258 bgcolor=#d6d6d6
| 491258 ||  || — || September 17, 2010 || Mount Lemmon || Mount Lemmon Survey || 3:2 || align=right | 3.6 km || 
|-id=259 bgcolor=#E9E9E9
| 491259 ||  || — || October 26, 2011 || Haleakala || Pan-STARRS || — || align=right data-sort-value="0.82" | 820 m || 
|-id=260 bgcolor=#fefefe
| 491260 ||  || — || September 29, 2011 || Kitt Peak || Spacewatch || — || align=right data-sort-value="0.77" | 770 m || 
|-id=261 bgcolor=#fefefe
| 491261 ||  || — || November 16, 2007 || Mount Lemmon || Mount Lemmon Survey || — || align=right | 1.1 km || 
|-id=262 bgcolor=#E9E9E9
| 491262 ||  || — || August 27, 2006 || Kitt Peak || Spacewatch || — || align=right | 1.9 km || 
|-id=263 bgcolor=#E9E9E9
| 491263 ||  || — || November 5, 2007 || Kitt Peak || Spacewatch || RAF || align=right data-sort-value="0.61" | 610 m || 
|-id=264 bgcolor=#d6d6d6
| 491264 ||  || — || October 24, 2011 || Haleakala || Pan-STARRS || — || align=right | 3.1 km || 
|-id=265 bgcolor=#fefefe
| 491265 ||  || — || October 21, 2011 || Kitt Peak || Spacewatch || V || align=right data-sort-value="0.70" | 700 m || 
|-id=266 bgcolor=#E9E9E9
| 491266 ||  || — || November 2, 2007 || Kitt Peak || Spacewatch || — || align=right | 1.0 km || 
|-id=267 bgcolor=#E9E9E9
| 491267 ||  || — || December 14, 1998 || Kitt Peak || Spacewatch || — || align=right | 1.3 km || 
|-id=268 bgcolor=#fefefe
| 491268 ||  || — || September 12, 2007 || Mount Lemmon || Mount Lemmon Survey || NYS || align=right data-sort-value="0.56" | 560 m || 
|-id=269 bgcolor=#fefefe
| 491269 ||  || — || October 30, 2011 || Kitt Peak || Spacewatch || — || align=right data-sort-value="0.76" | 760 m || 
|-id=270 bgcolor=#d6d6d6
| 491270 ||  || — || October 25, 2011 || Haleakala || Pan-STARRS || — || align=right | 2.4 km || 
|-id=271 bgcolor=#fefefe
| 491271 ||  || — || October 30, 2011 || Kitt Peak || Spacewatch || — || align=right data-sort-value="0.81" | 810 m || 
|-id=272 bgcolor=#d6d6d6
| 491272 ||  || — || October 24, 2011 || Haleakala || Pan-STARRS || — || align=right | 3.5 km || 
|-id=273 bgcolor=#fefefe
| 491273 ||  || — || October 24, 2011 || Haleakala || Pan-STARRS || — || align=right data-sort-value="0.93" | 930 m || 
|-id=274 bgcolor=#fefefe
| 491274 ||  || — || July 1, 2011 || Haleakala || Pan-STARRS || (2076) || align=right data-sort-value="0.85" | 850 m || 
|-id=275 bgcolor=#E9E9E9
| 491275 ||  || — || September 21, 2011 || Catalina || CSS || — || align=right | 1.5 km || 
|-id=276 bgcolor=#fefefe
| 491276 ||  || — || January 16, 2005 || Kitt Peak || Spacewatch || — || align=right data-sort-value="0.67" | 670 m || 
|-id=277 bgcolor=#d6d6d6
| 491277 ||  || — || November 20, 2006 || Mount Lemmon || Mount Lemmon Survey || — || align=right | 2.0 km || 
|-id=278 bgcolor=#d6d6d6
| 491278 ||  || — || October 24, 2011 || Haleakala || Pan-STARRS || — || align=right | 3.4 km || 
|-id=279 bgcolor=#E9E9E9
| 491279 ||  || — || October 25, 2011 || Haleakala || Pan-STARRS || — || align=right | 1.9 km || 
|-id=280 bgcolor=#E9E9E9
| 491280 ||  || — || September 24, 2011 || Mount Lemmon || Mount Lemmon Survey || (5) || align=right data-sort-value="0.74" | 740 m || 
|-id=281 bgcolor=#fefefe
| 491281 ||  || — || September 25, 2011 || Haleakala || Pan-STARRS || V || align=right data-sort-value="0.51" | 510 m || 
|-id=282 bgcolor=#C2FFFF
| 491282 ||  || — || February 1, 2011 || Haleakala || Pan-STARRS || L4 || align=right | 8.8 km || 
|-id=283 bgcolor=#E9E9E9
| 491283 ||  || — || September 26, 2011 || Catalina || CSS || — || align=right | 1.8 km || 
|-id=284 bgcolor=#d6d6d6
| 491284 ||  || — || September 30, 2011 || Kitt Peak || Spacewatch || EOS || align=right | 1.6 km || 
|-id=285 bgcolor=#fefefe
| 491285 ||  || — || September 25, 2011 || Haleakala || Pan-STARRS || — || align=right data-sort-value="0.84" | 840 m || 
|-id=286 bgcolor=#fefefe
| 491286 ||  || — || October 25, 2011 || Haleakala || Pan-STARRS || — || align=right data-sort-value="0.74" | 740 m || 
|-id=287 bgcolor=#E9E9E9
| 491287 ||  || — || September 18, 2011 || Catalina || CSS || — || align=right | 1.9 km || 
|-id=288 bgcolor=#E9E9E9
| 491288 ||  || — || September 23, 2011 || Haleakala || Pan-STARRS || JUN || align=right data-sort-value="0.88" | 880 m || 
|-id=289 bgcolor=#fefefe
| 491289 ||  || — || September 4, 2011 || Haleakala || Pan-STARRS || V || align=right data-sort-value="0.70" | 700 m || 
|-id=290 bgcolor=#fefefe
| 491290 ||  || — || April 10, 2010 || Kitt Peak || Spacewatch || V || align=right data-sort-value="0.70" | 700 m || 
|-id=291 bgcolor=#d6d6d6
| 491291 ||  || — || October 25, 2011 || Haleakala || Pan-STARRS || — || align=right | 3.3 km || 
|-id=292 bgcolor=#d6d6d6
| 491292 ||  || — || October 25, 2011 || Haleakala || Pan-STARRS || — || align=right | 3.3 km || 
|-id=293 bgcolor=#d6d6d6
| 491293 ||  || — || October 17, 2011 || Kitt Peak || Spacewatch || — || align=right | 1.9 km || 
|-id=294 bgcolor=#d6d6d6
| 491294 ||  || — || December 1, 2006 || Mount Lemmon || Mount Lemmon Survey || — || align=right | 2.0 km || 
|-id=295 bgcolor=#E9E9E9
| 491295 ||  || — || November 16, 2011 || Mount Lemmon || Mount Lemmon Survey || — || align=right | 2.1 km || 
|-id=296 bgcolor=#E9E9E9
| 491296 ||  || — || March 30, 2004 || Socorro || LINEAR || — || align=right | 2.2 km || 
|-id=297 bgcolor=#E9E9E9
| 491297 ||  || — || December 4, 2007 || Mount Lemmon || Mount Lemmon Survey || — || align=right data-sort-value="0.83" | 830 m || 
|-id=298 bgcolor=#fefefe
| 491298 ||  || — || September 9, 2007 || Mount Lemmon || Mount Lemmon Survey || MAS || align=right data-sort-value="0.75" | 750 m || 
|-id=299 bgcolor=#d6d6d6
| 491299 ||  || — || October 26, 2011 || Haleakala || Pan-STARRS || EOS || align=right | 2.5 km || 
|-id=300 bgcolor=#E9E9E9
| 491300 ||  || — || September 27, 2011 || Mount Lemmon || Mount Lemmon Survey || — || align=right | 1.5 km || 
|}

491301–491400 

|-bgcolor=#E9E9E9
| 491301 ||  || — || April 26, 2010 || WISE || WISE || — || align=right | 2.5 km || 
|-id=302 bgcolor=#E9E9E9
| 491302 ||  || — || October 26, 2011 || Haleakala || Pan-STARRS || — || align=right data-sort-value="0.82" | 820 m || 
|-id=303 bgcolor=#E9E9E9
| 491303 ||  || — || October 26, 2011 || Haleakala || Pan-STARRS || — || align=right data-sort-value="0.67" | 670 m || 
|-id=304 bgcolor=#d6d6d6
| 491304 ||  || — || November 18, 2011 || Kitt Peak || Spacewatch || — || align=right | 1.9 km || 
|-id=305 bgcolor=#fefefe
| 491305 ||  || — || October 11, 2004 || Kitt Peak || Spacewatch || — || align=right data-sort-value="0.56" | 560 m || 
|-id=306 bgcolor=#d6d6d6
| 491306 ||  || — || May 24, 2010 || WISE || WISE || — || align=right | 2.9 km || 
|-id=307 bgcolor=#fefefe
| 491307 ||  || — || October 25, 2011 || Haleakala || Pan-STARRS || — || align=right data-sort-value="0.95" | 950 m || 
|-id=308 bgcolor=#E9E9E9
| 491308 ||  || — || October 26, 2011 || Haleakala || Pan-STARRS || (5) || align=right data-sort-value="0.73" | 730 m || 
|-id=309 bgcolor=#d6d6d6
| 491309 ||  || — || October 23, 2011 || Kitt Peak || Spacewatch || — || align=right | 2.8 km || 
|-id=310 bgcolor=#d6d6d6
| 491310 ||  || — || October 26, 2011 || Haleakala || Pan-STARRS || — || align=right | 2.8 km || 
|-id=311 bgcolor=#d6d6d6
| 491311 ||  || — || September 2, 2010 || Mount Lemmon || Mount Lemmon Survey || — || align=right | 2.2 km || 
|-id=312 bgcolor=#E9E9E9
| 491312 ||  || — || October 26, 2011 || Haleakala || Pan-STARRS || — || align=right data-sort-value="0.94" | 940 m || 
|-id=313 bgcolor=#d6d6d6
| 491313 ||  || — || October 26, 2011 || Haleakala || Pan-STARRS || — || align=right | 2.5 km || 
|-id=314 bgcolor=#E9E9E9
| 491314 ||  || — || October 26, 2011 || Haleakala || Pan-STARRS || — || align=right | 1.1 km || 
|-id=315 bgcolor=#d6d6d6
| 491315 ||  || — || October 25, 2011 || Haleakala || Pan-STARRS || — || align=right | 3.0 km || 
|-id=316 bgcolor=#E9E9E9
| 491316 ||  || — || November 17, 2011 || Kitt Peak || Spacewatch || — || align=right | 1.3 km || 
|-id=317 bgcolor=#E9E9E9
| 491317 ||  || — || September 7, 2011 || Kitt Peak || Spacewatch || — || align=right | 1.4 km || 
|-id=318 bgcolor=#d6d6d6
| 491318 ||  || — || October 26, 2011 || Haleakala || Pan-STARRS || — || align=right | 3.5 km || 
|-id=319 bgcolor=#E9E9E9
| 491319 ||  || — || October 24, 2007 || Mount Lemmon || Mount Lemmon Survey || — || align=right data-sort-value="0.90" | 900 m || 
|-id=320 bgcolor=#d6d6d6
| 491320 ||  || — || October 25, 2011 || Haleakala || Pan-STARRS || HYG || align=right | 2.8 km || 
|-id=321 bgcolor=#d6d6d6
| 491321 ||  || — || October 26, 2011 || Haleakala || Pan-STARRS || — || align=right | 1.8 km || 
|-id=322 bgcolor=#E9E9E9
| 491322 ||  || — || October 25, 2011 || Haleakala || Pan-STARRS || MAR || align=right | 1.1 km || 
|-id=323 bgcolor=#fefefe
| 491323 ||  || — || October 26, 2011 || Haleakala || Pan-STARRS || — || align=right data-sort-value="0.71" | 710 m || 
|-id=324 bgcolor=#E9E9E9
| 491324 ||  || — || October 22, 2011 || Kitt Peak || Spacewatch || — || align=right | 1.1 km || 
|-id=325 bgcolor=#d6d6d6
| 491325 ||  || — || November 3, 2011 || Mount Lemmon || Mount Lemmon Survey || — || align=right | 2.7 km || 
|-id=326 bgcolor=#E9E9E9
| 491326 ||  || — || November 30, 2011 || Kitt Peak || Spacewatch || — || align=right | 2.1 km || 
|-id=327 bgcolor=#E9E9E9
| 491327 ||  || — || December 4, 2007 || Mount Lemmon || Mount Lemmon Survey || — || align=right | 1.0 km || 
|-id=328 bgcolor=#E9E9E9
| 491328 ||  || — || February 9, 2008 || Mount Lemmon || Mount Lemmon Survey || — || align=right | 1.1 km || 
|-id=329 bgcolor=#E9E9E9
| 491329 ||  || — || December 18, 2007 || Mount Lemmon || Mount Lemmon Survey || — || align=right | 1.1 km || 
|-id=330 bgcolor=#E9E9E9
| 491330 ||  || — || December 4, 2007 || Kitt Peak || Spacewatch || — || align=right | 1.1 km || 
|-id=331 bgcolor=#E9E9E9
| 491331 ||  || — || November 23, 2011 || Catalina || CSS || — || align=right | 1.1 km || 
|-id=332 bgcolor=#C2FFFF
| 491332 ||  || — || October 3, 2010 || Catalina || CSS || L4 || align=right | 15 km || 
|-id=333 bgcolor=#d6d6d6
| 491333 ||  || — || October 25, 2011 || Haleakala || Pan-STARRS || — || align=right | 3.2 km || 
|-id=334 bgcolor=#E9E9E9
| 491334 ||  || — || November 20, 2011 || Haleakala || Pan-STARRS || — || align=right | 2.9 km || 
|-id=335 bgcolor=#fefefe
| 491335 ||  || — || October 23, 2011 || Haleakala || Pan-STARRS || — || align=right data-sort-value="0.80" | 800 m || 
|-id=336 bgcolor=#E9E9E9
| 491336 ||  || — || October 26, 2011 || Haleakala || Pan-STARRS || KON || align=right | 2.0 km || 
|-id=337 bgcolor=#E9E9E9
| 491337 ||  || — || October 26, 2011 || Haleakala || Pan-STARRS || KON || align=right | 1.8 km || 
|-id=338 bgcolor=#E9E9E9
| 491338 ||  || — || November 24, 2011 || Mount Lemmon || Mount Lemmon Survey || — || align=right | 2.1 km || 
|-id=339 bgcolor=#E9E9E9
| 491339 ||  || — || December 27, 2011 || Mount Lemmon || Mount Lemmon Survey || — || align=right | 2.2 km || 
|-id=340 bgcolor=#E9E9E9
| 491340 ||  || — || December 27, 2011 || Mount Lemmon || Mount Lemmon Survey || — || align=right | 2.3 km || 
|-id=341 bgcolor=#E9E9E9
| 491341 ||  || — || December 25, 2011 || Kitt Peak || Spacewatch || EUN || align=right | 1.1 km || 
|-id=342 bgcolor=#E9E9E9
| 491342 ||  || — || October 3, 2006 || Mount Lemmon || Mount Lemmon Survey || — || align=right | 1.4 km || 
|-id=343 bgcolor=#E9E9E9
| 491343 ||  || — || February 27, 2008 || Kitt Peak || Spacewatch || — || align=right | 1.1 km || 
|-id=344 bgcolor=#fefefe
| 491344 ||  || — || December 25, 2011 || Kitt Peak || Spacewatch || — || align=right data-sort-value="0.88" | 880 m || 
|-id=345 bgcolor=#E9E9E9
| 491345 ||  || — || December 25, 2011 || Kitt Peak || Spacewatch || — || align=right | 2.9 km || 
|-id=346 bgcolor=#E9E9E9
| 491346 ||  || — || November 1, 2011 || Mount Lemmon || Mount Lemmon Survey || — || align=right | 1.2 km || 
|-id=347 bgcolor=#E9E9E9
| 491347 ||  || — || October 28, 2006 || Catalina || CSS || — || align=right | 1.9 km || 
|-id=348 bgcolor=#E9E9E9
| 491348 ||  || — || December 30, 2011 || Mount Lemmon || Mount Lemmon Survey || EUN || align=right data-sort-value="0.99" | 990 m || 
|-id=349 bgcolor=#E9E9E9
| 491349 ||  || — || February 28, 2008 || Mount Lemmon || Mount Lemmon Survey || DOR || align=right | 2.2 km || 
|-id=350 bgcolor=#E9E9E9
| 491350 ||  || — || December 26, 2011 || Kitt Peak || Spacewatch || — || align=right | 1.7 km || 
|-id=351 bgcolor=#E9E9E9
| 491351 ||  || — || December 30, 2007 || Kitt Peak || Spacewatch || (5) || align=right data-sort-value="0.85" | 850 m || 
|-id=352 bgcolor=#E9E9E9
| 491352 ||  || — || December 18, 2007 || Mount Lemmon || Mount Lemmon Survey || — || align=right data-sort-value="0.94" | 940 m || 
|-id=353 bgcolor=#FA8072
| 491353 ||  || — || November 19, 2006 || Kitt Peak || Spacewatch || — || align=right | 1.6 km || 
|-id=354 bgcolor=#E9E9E9
| 491354 ||  || — || January 1, 2012 || Mount Lemmon || Mount Lemmon Survey || — || align=right | 1.9 km || 
|-id=355 bgcolor=#E9E9E9
| 491355 ||  || — || November 19, 2007 || Mount Lemmon || Mount Lemmon Survey || — || align=right | 2.3 km || 
|-id=356 bgcolor=#E9E9E9
| 491356 ||  || — || November 24, 2011 || Haleakala || Pan-STARRS || — || align=right | 1.1 km || 
|-id=357 bgcolor=#E9E9E9
| 491357 ||  || — || December 24, 2011 || Catalina || CSS || — || align=right | 2.0 km || 
|-id=358 bgcolor=#C2FFFF
| 491358 ||  || — || September 15, 2009 || Kitt Peak || Spacewatch || L4 || align=right | 5.8 km || 
|-id=359 bgcolor=#E9E9E9
| 491359 ||  || — || November 14, 2006 || Mount Lemmon || Mount Lemmon Survey || — || align=right | 1.2 km || 
|-id=360 bgcolor=#E9E9E9
| 491360 ||  || — || February 10, 2008 || Kitt Peak || Spacewatch || — || align=right | 1.1 km || 
|-id=361 bgcolor=#E9E9E9
| 491361 ||  || — || December 11, 2006 || Kitt Peak || Spacewatch || GEF || align=right | 1.1 km || 
|-id=362 bgcolor=#E9E9E9
| 491362 ||  || — || January 19, 2012 || Kitt Peak || Spacewatch || — || align=right | 1.5 km || 
|-id=363 bgcolor=#E9E9E9
| 491363 ||  || — || January 1, 2012 || Mount Lemmon || Mount Lemmon Survey || ADE || align=right | 1.6 km || 
|-id=364 bgcolor=#E9E9E9
| 491364 ||  || — || January 4, 2012 || Kitt Peak || Spacewatch || — || align=right | 2.0 km || 
|-id=365 bgcolor=#E9E9E9
| 491365 ||  || — || March 7, 2008 || Kitt Peak || Spacewatch || MIS || align=right | 2.0 km || 
|-id=366 bgcolor=#fefefe
| 491366 ||  || — || November 5, 2007 || Kitt Peak || Spacewatch || — || align=right data-sort-value="0.57" | 570 m || 
|-id=367 bgcolor=#E9E9E9
| 491367 ||  || — || January 24, 2007 || Mount Lemmon || Mount Lemmon Survey || DOR || align=right | 2.3 km || 
|-id=368 bgcolor=#E9E9E9
| 491368 ||  || — || January 18, 2012 || Mount Lemmon || Mount Lemmon Survey || — || align=right | 1.4 km || 
|-id=369 bgcolor=#E9E9E9
| 491369 ||  || — || September 10, 2010 || La Sagra || OAM Obs. || — || align=right | 1.5 km || 
|-id=370 bgcolor=#E9E9E9
| 491370 ||  || — || November 28, 2011 || Mount Lemmon || Mount Lemmon Survey || — || align=right | 2.0 km || 
|-id=371 bgcolor=#E9E9E9
| 491371 ||  || — || January 21, 2012 || Kitt Peak || Spacewatch || — || align=right | 2.3 km || 
|-id=372 bgcolor=#E9E9E9
| 491372 ||  || — || November 22, 2011 || Mount Lemmon || Mount Lemmon Survey || EUN || align=right | 1.2 km || 
|-id=373 bgcolor=#E9E9E9
| 491373 ||  || — || August 13, 2010 || Kitt Peak || Spacewatch || — || align=right | 1.4 km || 
|-id=374 bgcolor=#fefefe
| 491374 ||  || — || February 10, 2002 || Socorro || LINEAR || H || align=right data-sort-value="0.64" | 640 m || 
|-id=375 bgcolor=#E9E9E9
| 491375 ||  || — || January 30, 2008 || Mount Lemmon || Mount Lemmon Survey || — || align=right | 1.2 km || 
|-id=376 bgcolor=#E9E9E9
| 491376 ||  || — || July 31, 2009 || Kitt Peak || Spacewatch || — || align=right | 2.3 km || 
|-id=377 bgcolor=#E9E9E9
| 491377 ||  || — || January 26, 2012 || Haleakala || Pan-STARRS || AGN || align=right data-sort-value="0.88" | 880 m || 
|-id=378 bgcolor=#E9E9E9
| 491378 ||  || — || November 15, 2006 || Mount Lemmon || Mount Lemmon Survey || — || align=right | 1.8 km || 
|-id=379 bgcolor=#E9E9E9
| 491379 ||  || — || January 18, 2012 || Kitt Peak || Spacewatch || — || align=right | 1.7 km || 
|-id=380 bgcolor=#E9E9E9
| 491380 ||  || — || December 25, 2011 || Mount Lemmon || Mount Lemmon Survey || EUN || align=right | 1.2 km || 
|-id=381 bgcolor=#E9E9E9
| 491381 ||  || — || December 24, 2011 || Mount Lemmon || Mount Lemmon Survey || — || align=right | 1.6 km || 
|-id=382 bgcolor=#E9E9E9
| 491382 ||  || — || January 1, 2012 || Mount Lemmon || Mount Lemmon Survey || — || align=right | 1.4 km || 
|-id=383 bgcolor=#E9E9E9
| 491383 ||  || — || January 19, 2012 || Haleakala || Pan-STARRS || — || align=right | 1.6 km || 
|-id=384 bgcolor=#E9E9E9
| 491384 ||  || — || December 28, 2011 || Kitt Peak || Spacewatch || — || align=right | 1.6 km || 
|-id=385 bgcolor=#fefefe
| 491385 ||  || — || January 19, 2012 || Haleakala || Pan-STARRS || — || align=right data-sort-value="0.79" | 790 m || 
|-id=386 bgcolor=#E9E9E9
| 491386 ||  || — || January 19, 2012 || Haleakala || Pan-STARRS || ADE || align=right | 1.9 km || 
|-id=387 bgcolor=#E9E9E9
| 491387 ||  || — || December 12, 2006 || Mount Lemmon || Mount Lemmon Survey || — || align=right | 2.1 km || 
|-id=388 bgcolor=#E9E9E9
| 491388 ||  || — || February 3, 2012 || Haleakala || Pan-STARRS || — || align=right | 1.6 km || 
|-id=389 bgcolor=#d6d6d6
| 491389 ||  || — || January 29, 2012 || Catalina || CSS || — || align=right | 2.2 km || 
|-id=390 bgcolor=#E9E9E9
| 491390 ||  || — || March 30, 2008 || Catalina || CSS || — || align=right | 1.5 km || 
|-id=391 bgcolor=#E9E9E9
| 491391 ||  || — || January 25, 2012 || Haleakala || Pan-STARRS || — || align=right | 2.2 km || 
|-id=392 bgcolor=#d6d6d6
| 491392 ||  || — || October 2, 2005 || Mount Lemmon || Mount Lemmon Survey || KOR || align=right | 1.2 km || 
|-id=393 bgcolor=#E9E9E9
| 491393 ||  || — || December 25, 2011 || Mount Lemmon || Mount Lemmon Survey || — || align=right | 2.2 km || 
|-id=394 bgcolor=#E9E9E9
| 491394 ||  || — || January 18, 2012 || Kitt Peak || Spacewatch || — || align=right | 1.6 km || 
|-id=395 bgcolor=#E9E9E9
| 491395 ||  || — || January 26, 2012 || Mount Lemmon || Mount Lemmon Survey || — || align=right | 1.5 km || 
|-id=396 bgcolor=#E9E9E9
| 491396 ||  || — || January 4, 2012 || Mount Lemmon || Mount Lemmon Survey || — || align=right | 1.5 km || 
|-id=397 bgcolor=#E9E9E9
| 491397 ||  || — || January 19, 2012 || Haleakala || Pan-STARRS || — || align=right | 2.0 km || 
|-id=398 bgcolor=#E9E9E9
| 491398 ||  || — || November 6, 2010 || Mount Lemmon || Mount Lemmon Survey || HOF || align=right | 2.1 km || 
|-id=399 bgcolor=#E9E9E9
| 491399 ||  || — || December 28, 2011 || Catalina || CSS || — || align=right | 2.5 km || 
|-id=400 bgcolor=#E9E9E9
| 491400 ||  || — || January 22, 2012 || Haleakala || Pan-STARRS || — || align=right | 2.4 km || 
|}

491401–491500 

|-bgcolor=#E9E9E9
| 491401 ||  || — || January 19, 2012 || Haleakala || Pan-STARRS || GEF || align=right data-sort-value="0.95" | 950 m || 
|-id=402 bgcolor=#E9E9E9
| 491402 ||  || — || January 19, 2012 || Kitt Peak || Spacewatch || — || align=right | 2.2 km || 
|-id=403 bgcolor=#C2FFFF
| 491403 ||  || — || September 30, 2007 || Kitt Peak || Spacewatch || L4 || align=right | 7.8 km || 
|-id=404 bgcolor=#E9E9E9
| 491404 ||  || — || January 19, 2012 || Haleakala || Pan-STARRS || — || align=right | 1.9 km || 
|-id=405 bgcolor=#E9E9E9
| 491405 ||  || — || May 28, 2008 || Mount Lemmon || Mount Lemmon Survey || — || align=right | 1.9 km || 
|-id=406 bgcolor=#E9E9E9
| 491406 ||  || — || November 10, 2010 || Mount Lemmon || Mount Lemmon Survey ||  || align=right | 1.8 km || 
|-id=407 bgcolor=#E9E9E9
| 491407 ||  || — || February 1, 2012 || Kitt Peak || Spacewatch || — || align=right | 1.9 km || 
|-id=408 bgcolor=#d6d6d6
| 491408 ||  || — || March 21, 2007 || Mount Lemmon || Mount Lemmon Survey || — || align=right | 2.2 km || 
|-id=409 bgcolor=#fefefe
| 491409 ||  || — || February 24, 2012 || Haleakala || Pan-STARRS || V || align=right data-sort-value="0.53" | 530 m || 
|-id=410 bgcolor=#E9E9E9
| 491410 ||  || — || November 6, 2010 || Mount Lemmon || Mount Lemmon Survey || — || align=right | 2.1 km || 
|-id=411 bgcolor=#fefefe
| 491411 ||  || — || February 13, 2012 || Haleakala || Pan-STARRS || — || align=right data-sort-value="0.78" | 780 m || 
|-id=412 bgcolor=#fefefe
| 491412 ||  || — || February 28, 2012 || Haleakala || Pan-STARRS || H || align=right data-sort-value="0.52" | 520 m || 
|-id=413 bgcolor=#fefefe
| 491413 ||  || — || February 21, 2012 || Kitt Peak || Spacewatch || H || align=right data-sort-value="0.63" | 630 m || 
|-id=414 bgcolor=#E9E9E9
| 491414 ||  || — || February 6, 2007 || Mount Lemmon || Mount Lemmon Survey || GEF || align=right data-sort-value="0.97" | 970 m || 
|-id=415 bgcolor=#fefefe
| 491415 ||  || — || February 14, 2012 || Haleakala || Pan-STARRS || — || align=right data-sort-value="0.64" | 640 m || 
|-id=416 bgcolor=#E9E9E9
| 491416 ||  || — || November 3, 2011 || Mount Lemmon || Mount Lemmon Survey || — || align=right | 2.3 km || 
|-id=417 bgcolor=#E9E9E9
| 491417 ||  || — || January 21, 2012 || Kitt Peak || Spacewatch || — || align=right | 2.0 km || 
|-id=418 bgcolor=#d6d6d6
| 491418 ||  || — || February 3, 2012 || Haleakala || Pan-STARRS || — || align=right | 2.3 km || 
|-id=419 bgcolor=#E9E9E9
| 491419 ||  || — || January 19, 2012 || Haleakala || Pan-STARRS || — || align=right | 1.3 km || 
|-id=420 bgcolor=#E9E9E9
| 491420 ||  || — || October 2, 2010 || Mount Lemmon || Mount Lemmon Survey || — || align=right | 2.4 km || 
|-id=421 bgcolor=#d6d6d6
| 491421 ||  || — || February 25, 2007 || Kitt Peak || Spacewatch || — || align=right | 2.3 km || 
|-id=422 bgcolor=#E9E9E9
| 491422 ||  || — || March 13, 2012 || Kitt Peak || Spacewatch || — || align=right | 1.9 km || 
|-id=423 bgcolor=#E9E9E9
| 491423 ||  || — || February 16, 2012 || Haleakala || Pan-STARRS || GEF || align=right | 1.5 km || 
|-id=424 bgcolor=#FFC2E0
| 491424 ||  || — || March 15, 2012 || Mount Lemmon || Mount Lemmon Survey || APO +1km || align=right | 1.1 km || 
|-id=425 bgcolor=#fefefe
| 491425 ||  || — || February 24, 2012 || Mount Lemmon || Mount Lemmon Survey || H || align=right data-sort-value="0.71" | 710 m || 
|-id=426 bgcolor=#E9E9E9
| 491426 ||  || — || November 7, 2010 || La Sagra || OAM Obs. || MAR || align=right | 1.4 km || 
|-id=427 bgcolor=#E9E9E9
| 491427 ||  || — || February 20, 2012 || Haleakala || Pan-STARRS || — || align=right | 2.0 km || 
|-id=428 bgcolor=#E9E9E9
| 491428 ||  || — || March 4, 2012 || Catalina || CSS || — || align=right | 2.8 km || 
|-id=429 bgcolor=#fefefe
| 491429 ||  || — || December 5, 2007 || Mount Lemmon || Mount Lemmon Survey || — || align=right data-sort-value="0.61" | 610 m || 
|-id=430 bgcolor=#E9E9E9
| 491430 ||  || — || January 28, 2007 || Mount Lemmon || Mount Lemmon Survey || — || align=right | 1.7 km || 
|-id=431 bgcolor=#d6d6d6
| 491431 ||  || — || September 27, 2009 || Mount Lemmon || Mount Lemmon Survey || — || align=right | 2.5 km || 
|-id=432 bgcolor=#fefefe
| 491432 ||  || — || March 13, 2007 || Mount Lemmon || Mount Lemmon Survey || H || align=right data-sort-value="0.56" | 560 m || 
|-id=433 bgcolor=#d6d6d6
| 491433 ||  || — || December 2, 2005 || Mount Lemmon || Mount Lemmon Survey || KOR || align=right | 1.2 km || 
|-id=434 bgcolor=#d6d6d6
| 491434 ||  || — || February 26, 2012 || Kitt Peak || Spacewatch || — || align=right | 3.4 km || 
|-id=435 bgcolor=#d6d6d6
| 491435 ||  || — || March 11, 2007 || Kitt Peak || Spacewatch || — || align=right | 1.9 km || 
|-id=436 bgcolor=#fefefe
| 491436 ||  || — || February 27, 2012 || Haleakala || Pan-STARRS || — || align=right data-sort-value="0.61" | 610 m || 
|-id=437 bgcolor=#d6d6d6
| 491437 ||  || — || March 14, 2012 || Mount Lemmon || Mount Lemmon Survey || — || align=right | 2.7 km || 
|-id=438 bgcolor=#E9E9E9
| 491438 ||  || — || April 6, 2008 || Kitt Peak || Spacewatch || — || align=right | 2.5 km || 
|-id=439 bgcolor=#E9E9E9
| 491439 ||  || — || February 27, 2012 || Kitt Peak || Spacewatch || — || align=right | 2.2 km || 
|-id=440 bgcolor=#d6d6d6
| 491440 ||  || — || March 23, 2012 || Kitt Peak || Spacewatch || — || align=right | 2.6 km || 
|-id=441 bgcolor=#d6d6d6
| 491441 ||  || — || October 18, 2009 || Mount Lemmon || Mount Lemmon Survey || KOR || align=right | 1.2 km || 
|-id=442 bgcolor=#E9E9E9
| 491442 ||  || — || February 25, 2012 || Kitt Peak || Spacewatch || — || align=right | 1.6 km || 
|-id=443 bgcolor=#E9E9E9
| 491443 ||  || — || February 14, 2012 || Haleakala || Pan-STARRS || — || align=right | 1.5 km || 
|-id=444 bgcolor=#d6d6d6
| 491444 ||  || — || March 16, 2012 || Kitt Peak || Spacewatch || — || align=right | 2.2 km || 
|-id=445 bgcolor=#FA8072
| 491445 ||  || — || September 5, 2010 || Mount Lemmon || Mount Lemmon Survey || H || align=right data-sort-value="0.43" | 430 m || 
|-id=446 bgcolor=#fefefe
| 491446 ||  || — || March 29, 2012 || Haleakala || Pan-STARRS || H || align=right data-sort-value="0.65" | 650 m || 
|-id=447 bgcolor=#E9E9E9
| 491447 ||  || — || February 28, 2012 || Haleakala || Pan-STARRS || — || align=right | 1.6 km || 
|-id=448 bgcolor=#d6d6d6
| 491448 ||  || — || February 26, 2012 || Kitt Peak || Spacewatch || — || align=right | 2.4 km || 
|-id=449 bgcolor=#d6d6d6
| 491449 ||  || — || August 28, 2009 || Kitt Peak || Spacewatch || — || align=right | 2.1 km || 
|-id=450 bgcolor=#E9E9E9
| 491450 ||  || — || February 28, 2012 || Haleakala || Pan-STARRS || AGN || align=right | 1.1 km || 
|-id=451 bgcolor=#E9E9E9
| 491451 ||  || — || October 28, 2010 || Mount Lemmon || Mount Lemmon Survey || DOR || align=right | 2.0 km || 
|-id=452 bgcolor=#E9E9E9
| 491452 ||  || — || February 28, 2012 || Haleakala || Pan-STARRS || — || align=right | 2.1 km || 
|-id=453 bgcolor=#E9E9E9
| 491453 ||  || — || February 28, 2012 || Haleakala || Pan-STARRS || — || align=right | 1.8 km || 
|-id=454 bgcolor=#d6d6d6
| 491454 ||  || — || March 23, 2012 || Kitt Peak || Spacewatch || — || align=right | 3.4 km || 
|-id=455 bgcolor=#E9E9E9
| 491455 ||  || — || October 17, 2010 || Mount Lemmon || Mount Lemmon Survey || — || align=right | 1.8 km || 
|-id=456 bgcolor=#fefefe
| 491456 ||  || — || April 2, 2012 || Haleakala || Pan-STARRS || H || align=right data-sort-value="0.67" | 670 m || 
|-id=457 bgcolor=#fefefe
| 491457 ||  || — || April 7, 2007 || Catalina || CSS || H || align=right data-sort-value="0.65" | 650 m || 
|-id=458 bgcolor=#d6d6d6
| 491458 ||  || — || April 13, 2012 || Kitt Peak || Spacewatch || — || align=right | 3.5 km || 
|-id=459 bgcolor=#d6d6d6
| 491459 ||  || — || January 30, 2011 || Haleakala || Pan-STARRS || — || align=right | 2.6 km || 
|-id=460 bgcolor=#d6d6d6
| 491460 ||  || — || January 30, 2012 || Haleakala || Pan-STARRS || — || align=right | 3.1 km || 
|-id=461 bgcolor=#fefefe
| 491461 ||  || — || May 15, 2007 || Mount Lemmon || Mount Lemmon Survey || H || align=right data-sort-value="0.46" | 460 m || 
|-id=462 bgcolor=#d6d6d6
| 491462 ||  || — || March 13, 2007 || Mount Lemmon || Mount Lemmon Survey || — || align=right | 2.3 km || 
|-id=463 bgcolor=#d6d6d6
| 491463 ||  || — || March 15, 2012 || Mount Lemmon || Mount Lemmon Survey || — || align=right | 3.3 km || 
|-id=464 bgcolor=#d6d6d6
| 491464 ||  || — || April 15, 2012 || Haleakala || Pan-STARRS || — || align=right | 3.2 km || 
|-id=465 bgcolor=#fefefe
| 491465 ||  || — || November 23, 2008 || Catalina || CSS || H || align=right data-sort-value="0.87" | 870 m || 
|-id=466 bgcolor=#d6d6d6
| 491466 ||  || — || April 13, 2012 || Catalina || CSS || BRA || align=right | 1.6 km || 
|-id=467 bgcolor=#d6d6d6
| 491467 ||  || — || April 15, 2012 || Haleakala || Pan-STARRS || EOS || align=right | 1.9 km || 
|-id=468 bgcolor=#d6d6d6
| 491468 ||  || — || February 1, 2006 || Kitt Peak || Spacewatch || — || align=right | 2.1 km || 
|-id=469 bgcolor=#d6d6d6
| 491469 ||  || — || January 29, 2011 || Mount Lemmon || Mount Lemmon Survey || — || align=right | 2.5 km || 
|-id=470 bgcolor=#d6d6d6
| 491470 ||  || — || April 21, 2012 || Mount Lemmon || Mount Lemmon Survey || — || align=right | 2.6 km || 
|-id=471 bgcolor=#d6d6d6
| 491471 ||  || — || January 26, 2011 || Mount Lemmon || Mount Lemmon Survey || EMA || align=right | 3.2 km || 
|-id=472 bgcolor=#E9E9E9
| 491472 ||  || — || February 22, 2007 || Catalina || CSS || GEF || align=right | 1.8 km || 
|-id=473 bgcolor=#FA8072
| 491473 ||  || — || March 29, 2007 || Kitt Peak || Spacewatch || H || align=right data-sort-value="0.47" | 470 m || 
|-id=474 bgcolor=#FA8072
| 491474 ||  || — || April 24, 2012 || Mount Lemmon || Mount Lemmon Survey || H || align=right data-sort-value="0.53" | 530 m || 
|-id=475 bgcolor=#d6d6d6
| 491475 ||  || — || January 30, 2011 || Haleakala || Pan-STARRS || — || align=right | 2.9 km || 
|-id=476 bgcolor=#d6d6d6
| 491476 ||  || — || April 21, 2012 || Haleakala || Pan-STARRS || — || align=right | 2.9 km || 
|-id=477 bgcolor=#fefefe
| 491477 ||  || — || October 6, 2005 || Kitt Peak || Spacewatch || H || align=right data-sort-value="0.50" | 500 m || 
|-id=478 bgcolor=#d6d6d6
| 491478 ||  || — || April 15, 2012 || Haleakala || Pan-STARRS || BRA || align=right | 1.3 km || 
|-id=479 bgcolor=#d6d6d6
| 491479 ||  || — || March 29, 2012 || Mount Lemmon || Mount Lemmon Survey || — || align=right | 2.5 km || 
|-id=480 bgcolor=#d6d6d6
| 491480 ||  || — || February 27, 2006 || Kitt Peak || Spacewatch || THM || align=right | 2.1 km || 
|-id=481 bgcolor=#d6d6d6
| 491481 ||  || — || February 1, 2006 || Kitt Peak || Spacewatch || — || align=right | 2.0 km || 
|-id=482 bgcolor=#d6d6d6
| 491482 ||  || — || January 31, 2006 || Kitt Peak || Spacewatch || — || align=right | 2.2 km || 
|-id=483 bgcolor=#d6d6d6
| 491483 ||  || — || October 23, 2009 || Kitt Peak || Spacewatch || EOS || align=right | 1.7 km || 
|-id=484 bgcolor=#d6d6d6
| 491484 ||  || — || March 24, 2012 || Kitt Peak || Spacewatch || — || align=right | 1.8 km || 
|-id=485 bgcolor=#fefefe
| 491485 ||  || — || October 31, 2010 || Mount Lemmon || Mount Lemmon Survey || H || align=right data-sort-value="0.41" | 410 m || 
|-id=486 bgcolor=#d6d6d6
| 491486 ||  || — || March 15, 2007 || Mount Lemmon || Mount Lemmon Survey || — || align=right | 1.9 km || 
|-id=487 bgcolor=#d6d6d6
| 491487 ||  || — || April 21, 2012 || Kitt Peak || Spacewatch || — || align=right | 3.1 km || 
|-id=488 bgcolor=#d6d6d6
| 491488 ||  || — || October 1, 2008 || Mount Lemmon || Mount Lemmon Survey || — || align=right | 2.5 km || 
|-id=489 bgcolor=#d6d6d6
| 491489 ||  || — || January 29, 2011 || Mount Lemmon || Mount Lemmon Survey || — || align=right | 2.8 km || 
|-id=490 bgcolor=#d6d6d6
| 491490 ||  || — || May 12, 2007 || Mount Lemmon || Mount Lemmon Survey || — || align=right | 2.4 km || 
|-id=491 bgcolor=#d6d6d6
| 491491 ||  || — || September 23, 2008 || Mount Lemmon || Mount Lemmon Survey || — || align=right | 2.6 km || 
|-id=492 bgcolor=#d6d6d6
| 491492 ||  || — || November 16, 2009 || Mount Lemmon || Mount Lemmon Survey || — || align=right | 2.7 km || 
|-id=493 bgcolor=#d6d6d6
| 491493 ||  || — || January 30, 2012 || Haleakala || Pan-STARRS || — || align=right | 2.8 km || 
|-id=494 bgcolor=#d6d6d6
| 491494 ||  || — || February 1, 2006 || Kitt Peak || Spacewatch || — || align=right | 2.5 km || 
|-id=495 bgcolor=#d6d6d6
| 491495 ||  || — || April 21, 2012 || Mount Lemmon || Mount Lemmon Survey || — || align=right | 3.4 km || 
|-id=496 bgcolor=#d6d6d6
| 491496 ||  || — || September 25, 2008 || Kitt Peak || Spacewatch || Tj (2.99) || align=right | 3.4 km || 
|-id=497 bgcolor=#fefefe
| 491497 ||  || — || April 19, 2012 || Mount Lemmon || Mount Lemmon Survey || H || align=right data-sort-value="0.48" | 480 m || 
|-id=498 bgcolor=#fefefe
| 491498 ||  || — || April 29, 2012 || Catalina || CSS || H || align=right data-sort-value="0.72" | 720 m || 
|-id=499 bgcolor=#d6d6d6
| 491499 ||  || — || October 4, 2002 || Socorro || LINEAR || — || align=right | 3.3 km || 
|-id=500 bgcolor=#fefefe
| 491500 ||  || — || April 15, 2004 || Anderson Mesa || LONEOS || H || align=right data-sort-value="0.82" | 820 m || 
|}

491501–491600 

|-bgcolor=#d6d6d6
| 491501 ||  || — || May 12, 2012 || Mount Lemmon || Mount Lemmon Survey || — || align=right | 3.1 km || 
|-id=502 bgcolor=#d6d6d6
| 491502 ||  || — || March 28, 2012 || Mount Lemmon || Mount Lemmon Survey || — || align=right | 3.1 km || 
|-id=503 bgcolor=#d6d6d6
| 491503 ||  || — || May 12, 2012 || Kitt Peak || Spacewatch || EOS || align=right | 2.1 km || 
|-id=504 bgcolor=#fefefe
| 491504 ||  || — || November 16, 2010 || Catalina || CSS || H || align=right data-sort-value="0.70" | 700 m || 
|-id=505 bgcolor=#fefefe
| 491505 ||  || — || April 14, 2012 || Haleakala || Pan-STARRS || H || align=right data-sort-value="0.62" | 620 m || 
|-id=506 bgcolor=#d6d6d6
| 491506 ||  || — || October 7, 2008 || Mount Lemmon || Mount Lemmon Survey || — || align=right | 3.3 km || 
|-id=507 bgcolor=#d6d6d6
| 491507 ||  || — || November 8, 2009 || Mount Lemmon || Mount Lemmon Survey || EOS || align=right | 1.6 km || 
|-id=508 bgcolor=#d6d6d6
| 491508 ||  || — || January 30, 2011 || Mount Lemmon || Mount Lemmon Survey || — || align=right | 3.0 km || 
|-id=509 bgcolor=#d6d6d6
| 491509 ||  || — || April 25, 2006 || Kitt Peak || Spacewatch || — || align=right | 3.1 km || 
|-id=510 bgcolor=#d6d6d6
| 491510 ||  || — || January 30, 2012 || Haleakala || Pan-STARRS || — || align=right | 2.5 km || 
|-id=511 bgcolor=#FA8072
| 491511 ||  || — || March 16, 2007 || Mount Lemmon || Mount Lemmon Survey || H || align=right data-sort-value="0.71" | 710 m || 
|-id=512 bgcolor=#d6d6d6
| 491512 ||  || — || May 11, 2007 || Mount Lemmon || Mount Lemmon Survey || TEL || align=right | 2.1 km || 
|-id=513 bgcolor=#fefefe
| 491513 ||  || — || May 11, 2012 || Kitt Peak || Spacewatch || H || align=right data-sort-value="0.59" | 590 m || 
|-id=514 bgcolor=#d6d6d6
| 491514 ||  || — || September 21, 2009 || Mount Lemmon || Mount Lemmon Survey || — || align=right | 2.7 km || 
|-id=515 bgcolor=#d6d6d6
| 491515 ||  || — || April 28, 2012 || Mount Lemmon || Mount Lemmon Survey || — || align=right | 2.1 km || 
|-id=516 bgcolor=#d6d6d6
| 491516 ||  || — || November 1, 2008 || Mount Lemmon || Mount Lemmon Survey || — || align=right | 3.2 km || 
|-id=517 bgcolor=#E9E9E9
| 491517 ||  || — || May 15, 2012 || Haleakala || Pan-STARRS || — || align=right | 1.6 km || 
|-id=518 bgcolor=#d6d6d6
| 491518 ||  || — || May 15, 2012 || Haleakala || Pan-STARRS || — || align=right | 3.8 km || 
|-id=519 bgcolor=#d6d6d6
| 491519 ||  || — || May 1, 2006 || Kitt Peak || Spacewatch || 7:4 || align=right | 4.2 km || 
|-id=520 bgcolor=#fefefe
| 491520 ||  || — || April 30, 2012 || Mount Lemmon || Mount Lemmon Survey || H || align=right data-sort-value="0.75" | 750 m || 
|-id=521 bgcolor=#fefefe
| 491521 ||  || — || February 3, 2009 || Catalina || CSS || H || align=right data-sort-value="0.75" | 750 m || 
|-id=522 bgcolor=#d6d6d6
| 491522 ||  || — || March 27, 1995 || Kitt Peak || Spacewatch || — || align=right | 2.4 km || 
|-id=523 bgcolor=#fefefe
| 491523 ||  || — || May 16, 2012 || Haleakala || Pan-STARRS || H || align=right data-sort-value="0.79" | 790 m || 
|-id=524 bgcolor=#d6d6d6
| 491524 ||  || — || November 30, 2003 || Kitt Peak || Spacewatch || — || align=right | 3.3 km || 
|-id=525 bgcolor=#d6d6d6
| 491525 ||  || — || February 4, 2011 || Haleakala || Pan-STARRS || HYG || align=right | 2.5 km || 
|-id=526 bgcolor=#d6d6d6
| 491526 ||  || — || May 18, 2012 || Kitt Peak || Spacewatch || — || align=right | 3.2 km || 
|-id=527 bgcolor=#d6d6d6
| 491527 ||  || — || January 30, 2011 || Haleakala || Pan-STARRS || — || align=right | 2.3 km || 
|-id=528 bgcolor=#d6d6d6
| 491528 ||  || — || March 15, 2012 || Mount Lemmon || Mount Lemmon Survey || — || align=right | 2.4 km || 
|-id=529 bgcolor=#d6d6d6
| 491529 ||  || — || September 29, 2009 || Mount Lemmon || Mount Lemmon Survey || — || align=right | 1.8 km || 
|-id=530 bgcolor=#d6d6d6
| 491530 ||  || — || January 27, 2006 || Kitt Peak || Spacewatch || — || align=right | 2.2 km || 
|-id=531 bgcolor=#d6d6d6
| 491531 ||  || — || May 21, 2012 || Haleakala || Pan-STARRS || EOS || align=right | 2.0 km || 
|-id=532 bgcolor=#d6d6d6
| 491532 ||  || — || February 13, 2011 || Mount Lemmon || Mount Lemmon Survey || — || align=right | 2.3 km || 
|-id=533 bgcolor=#d6d6d6
| 491533 ||  || — || May 16, 2012 || Kitt Peak || Spacewatch || — || align=right | 2.1 km || 
|-id=534 bgcolor=#d6d6d6
| 491534 ||  || — || February 5, 2011 || Haleakala || Pan-STARRS || — || align=right | 2.4 km || 
|-id=535 bgcolor=#d6d6d6
| 491535 ||  || — || May 15, 2012 || Haleakala || Pan-STARRS || — || align=right | 2.9 km || 
|-id=536 bgcolor=#fefefe
| 491536 ||  || — || October 17, 2010 || Mount Lemmon || Mount Lemmon Survey || H || align=right data-sort-value="0.47" | 470 m || 
|-id=537 bgcolor=#d6d6d6
| 491537 ||  || — || May 1, 2006 || Kitt Peak || Spacewatch || — || align=right | 3.0 km || 
|-id=538 bgcolor=#d6d6d6
| 491538 ||  || — || January 30, 2011 || Haleakala || Pan-STARRS || — || align=right | 2.4 km || 
|-id=539 bgcolor=#d6d6d6
| 491539 ||  || — || June 14, 2012 || Mount Lemmon || Mount Lemmon Survey || — || align=right | 3.4 km || 
|-id=540 bgcolor=#d6d6d6
| 491540 ||  || — || May 16, 2012 || Haleakala || Pan-STARRS || — || align=right | 2.3 km || 
|-id=541 bgcolor=#d6d6d6
| 491541 ||  || — || September 18, 2007 || Siding Spring || SSS || — || align=right | 3.4 km || 
|-id=542 bgcolor=#d6d6d6
| 491542 ||  || — || September 29, 2008 || Mount Lemmon || Mount Lemmon Survey || EOS || align=right | 1.8 km || 
|-id=543 bgcolor=#d6d6d6
| 491543 ||  || — || November 18, 2009 || Kitt Peak || Spacewatch || — || align=right | 4.0 km || 
|-id=544 bgcolor=#d6d6d6
| 491544 ||  || — || May 20, 2012 || Mount Lemmon || Mount Lemmon Survey || — || align=right | 3.1 km || 
|-id=545 bgcolor=#d6d6d6
| 491545 ||  || — || May 21, 2012 || Mount Lemmon || Mount Lemmon Survey || — || align=right | 2.5 km || 
|-id=546 bgcolor=#d6d6d6
| 491546 ||  || — || May 21, 2012 || Mount Lemmon || Mount Lemmon Survey || — || align=right | 2.6 km || 
|-id=547 bgcolor=#d6d6d6
| 491547 ||  || — || April 28, 2012 || Kitt Peak || Spacewatch || — || align=right | 2.8 km || 
|-id=548 bgcolor=#d6d6d6
| 491548 ||  || — || May 21, 2012 || Haleakala || Pan-STARRS || — || align=right | 4.0 km || 
|-id=549 bgcolor=#d6d6d6
| 491549 ||  || — || April 18, 2012 || Catalina || CSS || — || align=right | 8.8 km || 
|-id=550 bgcolor=#d6d6d6
| 491550 ||  || — || February 25, 2006 || Kitt Peak || Spacewatch || — || align=right | 2.5 km || 
|-id=551 bgcolor=#d6d6d6
| 491551 ||  || — || May 21, 2012 || Haleakala || Pan-STARRS || — || align=right | 3.1 km || 
|-id=552 bgcolor=#d6d6d6
| 491552 ||  || — || June 1, 2012 || Mount Lemmon || Mount Lemmon Survey || — || align=right | 3.5 km || 
|-id=553 bgcolor=#E9E9E9
| 491553 ||  || — || October 5, 2008 || La Sagra || OAM Obs. || — || align=right | 2.5 km || 
|-id=554 bgcolor=#fefefe
| 491554 ||  || — || August 10, 2012 || Kitt Peak || Spacewatch || — || align=right data-sort-value="0.65" | 650 m || 
|-id=555 bgcolor=#fefefe
| 491555 ||  || — || August 13, 2012 || Haleakala || Pan-STARRS || — || align=right data-sort-value="0.87" | 870 m || 
|-id=556 bgcolor=#E9E9E9
| 491556 ||  || — || October 6, 2008 || Catalina || CSS || — || align=right | 1.8 km || 
|-id=557 bgcolor=#fefefe
| 491557 ||  || — || August 14, 2012 || Haleakala || Pan-STARRS || — || align=right data-sort-value="0.84" | 840 m || 
|-id=558 bgcolor=#d6d6d6
| 491558 ||  || — || July 28, 2011 || Haleakala || Pan-STARRS || — || align=right | 2.8 km || 
|-id=559 bgcolor=#E9E9E9
| 491559 ||  || — || September 5, 2008 || Kitt Peak || Spacewatch || — || align=right | 1.2 km || 
|-id=560 bgcolor=#fefefe
| 491560 ||  || — || August 17, 2012 || Haleakala || Pan-STARRS || MAS || align=right data-sort-value="0.69" | 690 m || 
|-id=561 bgcolor=#d6d6d6
| 491561 ||  || — || April 6, 2011 || Mount Lemmon || Mount Lemmon Survey || Tj (2.98) || align=right | 3.1 km || 
|-id=562 bgcolor=#fefefe
| 491562 ||  || — || December 7, 2005 || Kitt Peak || Spacewatch || — || align=right data-sort-value="0.83" | 830 m || 
|-id=563 bgcolor=#d6d6d6
| 491563 ||  || — || October 11, 2007 || Kitt Peak || Spacewatch || — || align=right | 2.4 km || 
|-id=564 bgcolor=#fefefe
| 491564 ||  || — || August 11, 2012 || Siding Spring || SSS || — || align=right data-sort-value="0.79" | 790 m || 
|-id=565 bgcolor=#FFC2E0
| 491565 ||  || — || August 26, 2012 || Haleakala || Pan-STARRS || AMO +1km || align=right | 1.2 km || 
|-id=566 bgcolor=#fefefe
| 491566 ||  || — || August 14, 2012 || Haleakala || Pan-STARRS || — || align=right data-sort-value="0.98" | 980 m || 
|-id=567 bgcolor=#FFC2E0
| 491567 ||  || — || September 6, 2012 || Haleakala || Pan-STARRS || APO +1km || align=right data-sort-value="0.84" | 840 m || 
|-id=568 bgcolor=#E9E9E9
| 491568 ||  || — || September 30, 2008 || Catalina || CSS || — || align=right | 1.6 km || 
|-id=569 bgcolor=#fefefe
| 491569 ||  || — || July 26, 2008 || La Sagra || OAM Obs. || V || align=right | 1.1 km || 
|-id=570 bgcolor=#d6d6d6
| 491570 ||  || — || September 30, 2006 || Mount Lemmon || Mount Lemmon Survey || — || align=right | 3.6 km || 
|-id=571 bgcolor=#E9E9E9
| 491571 ||  || — || September 8, 1999 || Socorro || LINEAR || (1547) || align=right | 1.2 km || 
|-id=572 bgcolor=#E9E9E9
| 491572 ||  || — || October 15, 1998 || Xinglong || SCAP || — || align=right | 3.1 km || 
|-id=573 bgcolor=#E9E9E9
| 491573 ||  || — || September 12, 2012 || La Sagra || OAM Obs. || — || align=right | 2.9 km || 
|-id=574 bgcolor=#E9E9E9
| 491574 ||  || — || September 15, 2012 || Kitt Peak || Spacewatch || EUN || align=right | 1.3 km || 
|-id=575 bgcolor=#E9E9E9
| 491575 ||  || — || September 14, 2012 || Catalina || CSS || — || align=right | 2.1 km || 
|-id=576 bgcolor=#E9E9E9
| 491576 ||  || — || October 25, 2008 || Kitt Peak || Spacewatch || — || align=right | 1.1 km || 
|-id=577 bgcolor=#fefefe
| 491577 ||  || — || August 25, 2012 || Haleakala || Pan-STARRS || critical || align=right data-sort-value="0.86" | 860 m || 
|-id=578 bgcolor=#fefefe
| 491578 ||  || — || August 25, 2012 || Haleakala || Pan-STARRS || — || align=right data-sort-value="0.64" | 640 m || 
|-id=579 bgcolor=#E9E9E9
| 491579 ||  || — || November 18, 2003 || Kitt Peak || Spacewatch || AGN || align=right | 1.0 km || 
|-id=580 bgcolor=#E9E9E9
| 491580 ||  || — || February 5, 2000 || Kitt Peak || Spacewatch || — || align=right | 1.6 km || 
|-id=581 bgcolor=#fefefe
| 491581 ||  || — || February 4, 2011 || Haleakala || Pan-STARRS || — || align=right data-sort-value="0.82" | 820 m || 
|-id=582 bgcolor=#E9E9E9
| 491582 ||  || — || November 6, 2008 || Mount Lemmon || Mount Lemmon Survey || — || align=right data-sort-value="0.73" | 730 m || 
|-id=583 bgcolor=#fefefe
| 491583 ||  || — || September 6, 2008 || Mount Lemmon || Mount Lemmon Survey || — || align=right data-sort-value="0.69" | 690 m || 
|-id=584 bgcolor=#E9E9E9
| 491584 ||  || — || November 9, 1999 || Socorro || LINEAR || — || align=right | 1.3 km || 
|-id=585 bgcolor=#FA8072
| 491585 ||  || — || February 14, 2009 || Mount Lemmon || Mount Lemmon Survey || — || align=right | 1.7 km || 
|-id=586 bgcolor=#fefefe
| 491586 ||  || — || September 17, 2012 || Mount Lemmon || Mount Lemmon Survey || — || align=right data-sort-value="0.57" | 570 m || 
|-id=587 bgcolor=#d6d6d6
| 491587 ||  || — || September 17, 2012 || Kitt Peak || Spacewatch || — || align=right | 2.7 km || 
|-id=588 bgcolor=#E9E9E9
| 491588 ||  || — || August 28, 2012 || Mount Lemmon || Mount Lemmon Survey || — || align=right | 2.0 km || 
|-id=589 bgcolor=#fefefe
| 491589 ||  || — || September 6, 2008 || Mount Lemmon || Mount Lemmon Survey || MAS || align=right data-sort-value="0.68" | 680 m || 
|-id=590 bgcolor=#d6d6d6
| 491590 ||  || — || August 24, 2007 || Kitt Peak || Spacewatch || — || align=right | 1.8 km || 
|-id=591 bgcolor=#E9E9E9
| 491591 ||  || — || September 29, 2008 || Mount Lemmon || Mount Lemmon Survey || (5) || align=right data-sort-value="0.77" | 770 m || 
|-id=592 bgcolor=#fefefe
| 491592 ||  || — || August 26, 2012 || Haleakala || Pan-STARRS || NYS || align=right data-sort-value="0.61" | 610 m || 
|-id=593 bgcolor=#E9E9E9
| 491593 ||  || — || August 26, 2012 || Haleakala || Pan-STARRS || — || align=right | 1.8 km || 
|-id=594 bgcolor=#fefefe
| 491594 ||  || — || September 6, 2008 || Mount Lemmon || Mount Lemmon Survey || MAScritical || align=right data-sort-value="0.75" | 750 m || 
|-id=595 bgcolor=#E9E9E9
| 491595 ||  || — || September 6, 2008 || Mount Lemmon || Mount Lemmon Survey || — || align=right data-sort-value="0.94" | 940 m || 
|-id=596 bgcolor=#d6d6d6
| 491596 ||  || — || October 14, 2007 || Kitt Peak || Spacewatch || — || align=right | 2.4 km || 
|-id=597 bgcolor=#d6d6d6
| 491597 ||  || — || September 13, 2007 || Mount Lemmon || Mount Lemmon Survey || — || align=right | 2.1 km || 
|-id=598 bgcolor=#E9E9E9
| 491598 ||  || — || December 4, 2008 || Mount Lemmon || Mount Lemmon Survey || — || align=right | 1.0 km || 
|-id=599 bgcolor=#fefefe
| 491599 ||  || — || March 25, 2011 || Haleakala || Pan-STARRS || — || align=right data-sort-value="0.74" | 740 m || 
|-id=600 bgcolor=#d6d6d6
| 491600 ||  || — || September 3, 2007 || Mount Lemmon || Mount Lemmon Survey || BRA || align=right | 1.7 km || 
|}

491601–491700 

|-bgcolor=#E9E9E9
| 491601 ||  || — || September 28, 2003 || Kitt Peak || Spacewatch || — || align=right | 1.6 km || 
|-id=602 bgcolor=#fefefe
| 491602 ||  || — || September 7, 2008 || Catalina || CSS || NYScritical || align=right data-sort-value="0.63" | 630 m || 
|-id=603 bgcolor=#E9E9E9
| 491603 ||  || — || December 4, 2008 || Kitt Peak || Spacewatch || — || align=right | 1.1 km || 
|-id=604 bgcolor=#d6d6d6
| 491604 ||  || — || September 16, 2012 || Mount Lemmon || Mount Lemmon Survey || — || align=right | 3.2 km || 
|-id=605 bgcolor=#fefefe
| 491605 ||  || — || March 30, 2011 || Mount Lemmon || Mount Lemmon Survey || MAS || align=right data-sort-value="0.59" | 590 m || 
|-id=606 bgcolor=#E9E9E9
| 491606 ||  || — || October 20, 2008 || Mount Lemmon || Mount Lemmon Survey || — || align=right data-sort-value="0.69" | 690 m || 
|-id=607 bgcolor=#E9E9E9
| 491607 ||  || — || September 16, 2003 || Kitt Peak || Spacewatch || — || align=right | 1.1 km || 
|-id=608 bgcolor=#fefefe
| 491608 ||  || — || October 28, 2005 || Kitt Peak || Spacewatch || — || align=right data-sort-value="0.59" | 590 m || 
|-id=609 bgcolor=#d6d6d6
| 491609 ||  || — || January 25, 2009 || Kitt Peak || Spacewatch || — || align=right | 2.7 km || 
|-id=610 bgcolor=#fefefe
| 491610 ||  || — || September 23, 2001 || Kitt Peak || Spacewatch || MAS || align=right data-sort-value="0.57" | 570 m || 
|-id=611 bgcolor=#C2FFFF
| 491611 ||  || — || January 19, 2005 || Kitt Peak || Spacewatch || L5 || align=right | 12 km || 
|-id=612 bgcolor=#fefefe
| 491612 ||  || — || January 12, 2010 || Kitt Peak || Spacewatch || — || align=right data-sort-value="0.77" | 770 m || 
|-id=613 bgcolor=#fefefe
| 491613 ||  || — || October 6, 2012 || Kitt Peak || Spacewatch || — || align=right data-sort-value="0.72" | 720 m || 
|-id=614 bgcolor=#d6d6d6
| 491614 ||  || — || December 17, 2001 || Socorro || LINEAR || — || align=right | 3.4 km || 
|-id=615 bgcolor=#E9E9E9
| 491615 ||  || — || November 19, 2003 || Kitt Peak || Spacewatch || — || align=right | 2.2 km || 
|-id=616 bgcolor=#d6d6d6
| 491616 ||  || — || September 15, 2007 || Kitt Peak || Spacewatch || — || align=right | 2.9 km || 
|-id=617 bgcolor=#d6d6d6
| 491617 ||  || — || October 7, 2007 || Kitt Peak || Spacewatch || EOS || align=right | 1.6 km || 
|-id=618 bgcolor=#fefefe
| 491618 ||  || — || April 3, 2011 || Haleakala || Pan-STARRS || — || align=right data-sort-value="0.85" | 850 m || 
|-id=619 bgcolor=#d6d6d6
| 491619 ||  || — || October 7, 2012 || Haleakala || Pan-STARRS || THM || align=right | 2.4 km || 
|-id=620 bgcolor=#fefefe
| 491620 ||  || — || September 16, 2012 || Kitt Peak || Spacewatch || MAS || align=right data-sort-value="0.66" | 660 m || 
|-id=621 bgcolor=#E9E9E9
| 491621 ||  || — || October 8, 2012 || Kitt Peak || Spacewatch || — || align=right | 1.6 km || 
|-id=622 bgcolor=#d6d6d6
| 491622 ||  || — || September 26, 2006 || Kitt Peak || Spacewatch || — || align=right | 2.3 km || 
|-id=623 bgcolor=#E9E9E9
| 491623 ||  || — || September 26, 2008 || Kitt Peak || Spacewatch || — || align=right data-sort-value="0.78" | 780 m || 
|-id=624 bgcolor=#fefefe
| 491624 ||  || — || April 23, 2011 || Haleakala || Pan-STARRS || — || align=right data-sort-value="0.89" | 890 m || 
|-id=625 bgcolor=#d6d6d6
| 491625 ||  || — || September 25, 2006 || Mount Lemmon || Mount Lemmon Survey || — || align=right | 2.9 km || 
|-id=626 bgcolor=#d6d6d6
| 491626 ||  || — || March 1, 2011 || Mount Lemmon || Mount Lemmon Survey || Tj (2.99) || align=right | 3.4 km || 
|-id=627 bgcolor=#E9E9E9
| 491627 ||  || — || October 21, 2008 || Kitt Peak || Spacewatch || — || align=right | 1.1 km || 
|-id=628 bgcolor=#d6d6d6
| 491628 ||  || — || September 19, 2012 || Mount Lemmon || Mount Lemmon Survey || — || align=right | 2.7 km || 
|-id=629 bgcolor=#E9E9E9
| 491629 ||  || — || October 8, 2012 || Haleakala || Pan-STARRS || — || align=right data-sort-value="0.98" | 980 m || 
|-id=630 bgcolor=#fefefe
| 491630 ||  || — || October 8, 2012 || Haleakala || Pan-STARRS || — || align=right data-sort-value="0.73" | 730 m || 
|-id=631 bgcolor=#fefefe
| 491631 ||  || — || October 8, 2012 || Haleakala || Pan-STARRS || MAS || align=right data-sort-value="0.74" | 740 m || 
|-id=632 bgcolor=#E9E9E9
| 491632 ||  || — || November 20, 2008 || Mount Lemmon || Mount Lemmon Survey || — || align=right | 1.1 km || 
|-id=633 bgcolor=#d6d6d6
| 491633 ||  || — || September 22, 2001 || Kitt Peak || Spacewatch || — || align=right | 3.4 km || 
|-id=634 bgcolor=#d6d6d6
| 491634 ||  || — || October 20, 2006 || Kitt Peak || Spacewatch || 7:4 || align=right | 2.7 km || 
|-id=635 bgcolor=#d6d6d6
| 491635 ||  || — || October 11, 2007 || Kitt Peak || Spacewatch || — || align=right | 2.1 km || 
|-id=636 bgcolor=#E9E9E9
| 491636 ||  || — || October 9, 2012 || Mount Lemmon || Mount Lemmon Survey || — || align=right data-sort-value="0.83" | 830 m || 
|-id=637 bgcolor=#E9E9E9
| 491637 ||  || — || October 9, 2012 || Mount Lemmon || Mount Lemmon Survey || — || align=right | 1.0 km || 
|-id=638 bgcolor=#fefefe
| 491638 ||  || — || December 27, 2005 || Kitt Peak || Spacewatch || NYS || align=right data-sort-value="0.44" | 440 m || 
|-id=639 bgcolor=#d6d6d6
| 491639 ||  || — || August 28, 2006 || Kitt Peak || Spacewatch || — || align=right | 2.8 km || 
|-id=640 bgcolor=#d6d6d6
| 491640 ||  || — || November 19, 2001 || Anderson Mesa || LONEOS || — || align=right | 1.9 km || 
|-id=641 bgcolor=#fefefe
| 491641 ||  || — || September 26, 2005 || Kitt Peak || Spacewatch || — || align=right data-sort-value="0.57" | 570 m || 
|-id=642 bgcolor=#E9E9E9
| 491642 ||  || — || December 31, 2008 || Kitt Peak || Spacewatch || critical || align=right data-sort-value="0.96" | 960 m || 
|-id=643 bgcolor=#E9E9E9
| 491643 ||  || — || October 1, 2008 || Mount Lemmon || Mount Lemmon Survey || BRG || align=right | 1.0 km || 
|-id=644 bgcolor=#fefefe
| 491644 ||  || — || October 11, 2012 || Haleakala || Pan-STARRS || — || align=right data-sort-value="0.75" | 750 m || 
|-id=645 bgcolor=#fefefe
| 491645 ||  || — || October 11, 2012 || Haleakala || Pan-STARRS || — || align=right data-sort-value="0.54" | 540 m || 
|-id=646 bgcolor=#E9E9E9
| 491646 ||  || — || September 26, 2008 || Kitt Peak || Spacewatch || — || align=right data-sort-value="0.68" | 680 m || 
|-id=647 bgcolor=#fefefe
| 491647 ||  || — || October 17, 2001 || Socorro || LINEAR || — || align=right data-sort-value="0.93" | 930 m || 
|-id=648 bgcolor=#E9E9E9
| 491648 ||  || — || October 14, 2012 || Kitt Peak || Spacewatch || MRX || align=right data-sort-value="0.94" | 940 m || 
|-id=649 bgcolor=#E9E9E9
| 491649 ||  || — || November 20, 2008 || Kitt Peak || Spacewatch || — || align=right | 1.2 km || 
|-id=650 bgcolor=#E9E9E9
| 491650 ||  || — || November 19, 2008 || Mount Lemmon || Mount Lemmon Survey || — || align=right | 1.2 km || 
|-id=651 bgcolor=#d6d6d6
| 491651 ||  || — || January 31, 2009 || Kitt Peak || Spacewatch || — || align=right | 2.3 km || 
|-id=652 bgcolor=#E9E9E9
| 491652 ||  || — || November 9, 2008 || Kitt Peak || Spacewatch || — || align=right data-sort-value="0.76" | 760 m || 
|-id=653 bgcolor=#FA8072
| 491653 ||  || — || November 6, 2005 || Socorro || LINEAR || — || align=right data-sort-value="0.71" | 710 m || 
|-id=654 bgcolor=#E9E9E9
| 491654 ||  || — || October 22, 2008 || Kitt Peak || Spacewatch || — || align=right data-sort-value="0.81" | 810 m || 
|-id=655 bgcolor=#E9E9E9
| 491655 ||  || — || September 23, 2008 || Kitt Peak || Spacewatch || — || align=right data-sort-value="0.79" | 790 m || 
|-id=656 bgcolor=#fefefe
| 491656 ||  || — || August 21, 2004 || Siding Spring || SSS || — || align=right data-sort-value="0.70" | 700 m || 
|-id=657 bgcolor=#fefefe
| 491657 ||  || — || December 17, 2009 || Kitt Peak || Spacewatch || — || align=right data-sort-value="0.54" | 540 m || 
|-id=658 bgcolor=#d6d6d6
| 491658 ||  || — || October 9, 2012 || Kitt Peak || Spacewatch || — || align=right | 1.9 km || 
|-id=659 bgcolor=#d6d6d6
| 491659 ||  || — || February 20, 2009 || Mount Lemmon || Mount Lemmon Survey || — || align=right | 2.7 km || 
|-id=660 bgcolor=#d6d6d6
| 491660 ||  || — || July 25, 2011 || Haleakala || Pan-STARRS || VER || align=right | 2.8 km || 
|-id=661 bgcolor=#E9E9E9
| 491661 ||  || — || October 18, 2003 || Anderson Mesa || LONEOS || — || align=right | 2.0 km || 
|-id=662 bgcolor=#E9E9E9
| 491662 ||  || — || September 20, 2003 || Kitt Peak || Spacewatch || — || align=right | 1.4 km || 
|-id=663 bgcolor=#d6d6d6
| 491663 ||  || — || October 16, 2007 || Catalina || CSS || — || align=right | 2.6 km || 
|-id=664 bgcolor=#fefefe
| 491664 ||  || — || August 26, 2012 || Kitt Peak || Spacewatch || NYS || align=right data-sort-value="0.71" | 710 m || 
|-id=665 bgcolor=#E9E9E9
| 491665 ||  || — || October 8, 2012 || Haleakala || Pan-STARRS || — || align=right | 1.5 km || 
|-id=666 bgcolor=#E9E9E9
| 491666 ||  || — || November 19, 2008 || Kitt Peak || Spacewatch || — || align=right data-sort-value="0.94" | 940 m || 
|-id=667 bgcolor=#E9E9E9
| 491667 ||  || — || September 17, 2012 || Mount Lemmon || Mount Lemmon Survey || AGN || align=right | 1.2 km || 
|-id=668 bgcolor=#d6d6d6
| 491668 ||  || — || July 28, 2011 || Haleakala || Pan-STARRS || — || align=right | 3.4 km || 
|-id=669 bgcolor=#d6d6d6
| 491669 ||  || — || October 9, 2007 || Kitt Peak || Spacewatch || — || align=right | 2.5 km || 
|-id=670 bgcolor=#E9E9E9
| 491670 ||  || — || October 22, 2008 || Kitt Peak || Spacewatch || — || align=right data-sort-value="0.70" | 700 m || 
|-id=671 bgcolor=#fefefe
| 491671 ||  || — || October 16, 2012 || Mount Lemmon || Mount Lemmon Survey || — || align=right data-sort-value="0.52" | 520 m || 
|-id=672 bgcolor=#E9E9E9
| 491672 ||  || — || October 16, 2012 || Mount Lemmon || Mount Lemmon Survey || AST || align=right | 1.6 km || 
|-id=673 bgcolor=#E9E9E9
| 491673 ||  || — || April 10, 2010 || Mount Lemmon || Mount Lemmon Survey || — || align=right | 1.9 km || 
|-id=674 bgcolor=#d6d6d6
| 491674 ||  || — || November 15, 2007 || Mount Lemmon || Mount Lemmon Survey || EOS || align=right | 1.9 km || 
|-id=675 bgcolor=#E9E9E9
| 491675 ||  || — || September 19, 2003 || Kitt Peak || Spacewatch || ADE || align=right | 1.5 km || 
|-id=676 bgcolor=#d6d6d6
| 491676 ||  || — || August 27, 2006 || Kitt Peak || Spacewatch || THM || align=right | 2.0 km || 
|-id=677 bgcolor=#fefefe
| 491677 ||  || — || October 16, 2012 || Kitt Peak || Spacewatch || — || align=right data-sort-value="0.75" | 750 m || 
|-id=678 bgcolor=#d6d6d6
| 491678 ||  || — || October 16, 2012 || Kitt Peak || Spacewatch || — || align=right | 2.3 km || 
|-id=679 bgcolor=#d6d6d6
| 491679 ||  || — || September 16, 2012 || Mount Lemmon || Mount Lemmon Survey || — || align=right | 2.5 km || 
|-id=680 bgcolor=#E9E9E9
| 491680 ||  || — || October 8, 2012 || Mount Lemmon || Mount Lemmon Survey || — || align=right | 1.1 km || 
|-id=681 bgcolor=#d6d6d6
| 491681 ||  || — || October 10, 2007 || Kitt Peak || Spacewatch || KOR || align=right | 1.3 km || 
|-id=682 bgcolor=#fefefe
| 491682 ||  || — || April 23, 2011 || Haleakala || Pan-STARRS || NYS || align=right data-sort-value="0.72" | 720 m || 
|-id=683 bgcolor=#fefefe
| 491683 ||  || — || October 8, 2012 || Haleakala || Pan-STARRS || — || align=right data-sort-value="0.78" | 780 m || 
|-id=684 bgcolor=#E9E9E9
| 491684 ||  || — || September 12, 2007 || Mount Lemmon || Mount Lemmon Survey || — || align=right | 1.5 km || 
|-id=685 bgcolor=#fefefe
| 491685 ||  || — || October 17, 2012 || Mount Lemmon || Mount Lemmon Survey || — || align=right data-sort-value="0.68" | 680 m || 
|-id=686 bgcolor=#E9E9E9
| 491686 ||  || — || October 18, 2012 || Haleakala || Pan-STARRS ||  || align=right | 1.6 km || 
|-id=687 bgcolor=#fefefe
| 491687 ||  || — || October 5, 2012 || Kitt Peak || Spacewatch || — || align=right data-sort-value="0.62" | 620 m || 
|-id=688 bgcolor=#d6d6d6
| 491688 ||  || — || October 7, 2007 || Mount Lemmon || Mount Lemmon Survey || EOS || align=right | 1.5 km || 
|-id=689 bgcolor=#E9E9E9
| 491689 ||  || — || November 14, 1995 || Kitt Peak || Spacewatch || — || align=right | 1.1 km || 
|-id=690 bgcolor=#d6d6d6
| 491690 ||  || — || November 4, 2007 || Kitt Peak || Spacewatch || — || align=right | 2.2 km || 
|-id=691 bgcolor=#d6d6d6
| 491691 ||  || — || December 30, 2007 || Mount Lemmon || Mount Lemmon Survey || — || align=right | 2.5 km || 
|-id=692 bgcolor=#E9E9E9
| 491692 ||  || — || October 8, 2012 || Haleakala || Pan-STARRS || — || align=right | 1.2 km || 
|-id=693 bgcolor=#d6d6d6
| 491693 ||  || — || March 24, 2009 || Mount Lemmon || Mount Lemmon Survey || — || align=right | 2.6 km || 
|-id=694 bgcolor=#fefefe
| 491694 ||  || — || October 6, 2012 || Kitt Peak || Spacewatch || — || align=right data-sort-value="0.67" | 670 m || 
|-id=695 bgcolor=#d6d6d6
| 491695 ||  || — || March 28, 2009 || Kitt Peak || Spacewatch || — || align=right | 2.2 km || 
|-id=696 bgcolor=#d6d6d6
| 491696 ||  || — || July 26, 2011 || Haleakala || Pan-STARRS || — || align=right | 2.2 km || 
|-id=697 bgcolor=#d6d6d6
| 491697 ||  || — || November 18, 2007 || Kitt Peak || Spacewatch || — || align=right | 2.1 km || 
|-id=698 bgcolor=#d6d6d6
| 491698 ||  || — || November 16, 2001 || Kitt Peak || Spacewatch || THM || align=right | 2.1 km || 
|-id=699 bgcolor=#E9E9E9
| 491699 ||  || — || October 21, 2008 || Kitt Peak || Spacewatch || — || align=right data-sort-value="0.85" | 850 m || 
|-id=700 bgcolor=#d6d6d6
| 491700 ||  || — || October 8, 2012 || Mount Lemmon || Mount Lemmon Survey || — || align=right | 2.2 km || 
|}

491701–491800 

|-bgcolor=#fefefe
| 491701 ||  || — || December 21, 2005 || Kitt Peak || Spacewatch || — || align=right data-sort-value="0.62" | 620 m || 
|-id=702 bgcolor=#d6d6d6
| 491702 ||  || — || August 28, 2006 || Kitt Peak || Spacewatch || — || align=right | 2.7 km || 
|-id=703 bgcolor=#d6d6d6
| 491703 ||  || — || October 11, 2012 || Haleakala || Pan-STARRS || KOR || align=right | 1.1 km || 
|-id=704 bgcolor=#d6d6d6
| 491704 ||  || — || October 14, 2001 || Kitt Peak || Spacewatch || — || align=right | 2.1 km || 
|-id=705 bgcolor=#d6d6d6
| 491705 ||  || — || October 30, 2007 || Kitt Peak || Spacewatch || — || align=right | 2.1 km || 
|-id=706 bgcolor=#E9E9E9
| 491706 ||  || — || October 11, 2012 || Haleakala || Pan-STARRS || — || align=right | 1.1 km || 
|-id=707 bgcolor=#E9E9E9
| 491707 ||  || — || October 8, 2012 || Kitt Peak || Spacewatch || — || align=right | 1.9 km || 
|-id=708 bgcolor=#d6d6d6
| 491708 ||  || — || November 13, 2007 || Kitt Peak || Spacewatch || — || align=right | 2.8 km || 
|-id=709 bgcolor=#d6d6d6
| 491709 ||  || — || October 19, 2012 || Mount Lemmon || Mount Lemmon Survey || — || align=right | 2.9 km || 
|-id=710 bgcolor=#d6d6d6
| 491710 ||  || — || August 28, 2006 || Siding Spring || SSS || — || align=right | 3.5 km || 
|-id=711 bgcolor=#E9E9E9
| 491711 ||  || — || September 28, 2003 || Socorro || LINEAR || — || align=right | 1.5 km || 
|-id=712 bgcolor=#E9E9E9
| 491712 ||  || — || November 19, 2008 || Kitt Peak || Spacewatch || (5) || align=right data-sort-value="0.87" | 870 m || 
|-id=713 bgcolor=#E9E9E9
| 491713 ||  || — || September 4, 1999 || Kitt Peak || Spacewatch || — || align=right data-sort-value="0.85" | 850 m || 
|-id=714 bgcolor=#fefefe
| 491714 ||  || — || November 10, 2005 || Kitt Peak || Spacewatch || — || align=right data-sort-value="0.59" | 590 m || 
|-id=715 bgcolor=#E9E9E9
| 491715 ||  || — || October 18, 2012 || Haleakala || Pan-STARRS || AGN || align=right data-sort-value="0.98" | 980 m || 
|-id=716 bgcolor=#E9E9E9
| 491716 ||  || — || October 8, 2012 || Haleakala || Pan-STARRS || — || align=right | 1.6 km || 
|-id=717 bgcolor=#d6d6d6
| 491717 ||  || — || October 19, 2012 || Haleakala || Pan-STARRS || — || align=right | 2.5 km || 
|-id=718 bgcolor=#E9E9E9
| 491718 ||  || — || October 24, 2003 || Socorro || LINEAR || — || align=right | 1.3 km || 
|-id=719 bgcolor=#d6d6d6
| 491719 ||  || — || December 4, 2007 || Kitt Peak || Spacewatch || THM || align=right | 2.1 km || 
|-id=720 bgcolor=#E9E9E9
| 491720 ||  || — || October 14, 2012 || Kitt Peak || Spacewatch || JUN || align=right data-sort-value="0.63" | 630 m || 
|-id=721 bgcolor=#fefefe
| 491721 ||  || — || October 14, 2012 || Kitt Peak || Spacewatch || — || align=right data-sort-value="0.62" | 620 m || 
|-id=722 bgcolor=#d6d6d6
| 491722 ||  || — || December 17, 2001 || Socorro || LINEAR || — || align=right | 3.0 km || 
|-id=723 bgcolor=#d6d6d6
| 491723 ||  || — || October 22, 2006 || Mount Lemmon || Mount Lemmon Survey || VER || align=right | 3.0 km || 
|-id=724 bgcolor=#E9E9E9
| 491724 ||  || — || October 22, 2012 || Haleakala || Pan-STARRS || MRX || align=right data-sort-value="0.86" | 860 m || 
|-id=725 bgcolor=#d6d6d6
| 491725 ||  || — || October 10, 2012 || Haleakala || Pan-STARRS || — || align=right | 3.1 km || 
|-id=726 bgcolor=#d6d6d6
| 491726 ||  || — || June 27, 2010 || WISE || WISE || — || align=right | 3.7 km || 
|-id=727 bgcolor=#d6d6d6
| 491727 ||  || — || September 2, 2011 || Haleakala || Pan-STARRS || 3:2 || align=right | 4.0 km || 
|-id=728 bgcolor=#E9E9E9
| 491728 ||  || — || October 23, 2012 || Mount Lemmon || Mount Lemmon Survey || — || align=right | 2.2 km || 
|-id=729 bgcolor=#fefefe
| 491729 ||  || — || September 10, 2012 || Siding Spring || SSS || — || align=right data-sort-value="0.91" | 910 m || 
|-id=730 bgcolor=#E9E9E9
| 491730 ||  || — || October 6, 2012 || Haleakala || Pan-STARRS || — || align=right | 2.1 km || 
|-id=731 bgcolor=#fefefe
| 491731 ||  || — || October 9, 2012 || Haleakala || Pan-STARRS || H || align=right data-sort-value="0.81" | 810 m || 
|-id=732 bgcolor=#E9E9E9
| 491732 ||  || — || October 18, 2012 || Haleakala || Pan-STARRS || — || align=right | 1.2 km || 
|-id=733 bgcolor=#d6d6d6
| 491733 ||  || — || October 22, 2012 || Haleakala || Pan-STARRS || 3:2 || align=right | 3.1 km || 
|-id=734 bgcolor=#FA8072
| 491734 ||  || — || December 11, 2001 || Socorro || LINEAR || — || align=right data-sort-value="0.88" | 880 m || 
|-id=735 bgcolor=#d6d6d6
| 491735 ||  || — || October 24, 2001 || Kitt Peak || Spacewatch || THM || align=right | 2.0 km || 
|-id=736 bgcolor=#d6d6d6
| 491736 ||  || — || February 1, 2006 || Kitt Peak || Spacewatch || 3:2 || align=right | 3.5 km || 
|-id=737 bgcolor=#E9E9E9
| 491737 ||  || — || November 5, 2012 || Kitt Peak || Spacewatch || EUN || align=right | 1.2 km || 
|-id=738 bgcolor=#d6d6d6
| 491738 ||  || — || October 19, 2007 || Kitt Peak || Spacewatch || — || align=right | 2.6 km || 
|-id=739 bgcolor=#E9E9E9
| 491739 ||  || — || May 31, 2010 || WISE || WISE || — || align=right | 2.1 km || 
|-id=740 bgcolor=#d6d6d6
| 491740 ||  || — || October 21, 2012 || Haleakala || Pan-STARRS || — || align=right | 3.1 km || 
|-id=741 bgcolor=#d6d6d6
| 491741 ||  || — || August 30, 2011 || Haleakala || Pan-STARRS || 3:2 || align=right | 4.9 km || 
|-id=742 bgcolor=#d6d6d6
| 491742 ||  || — || October 21, 2012 || Haleakala || Pan-STARRS || — || align=right | 3.6 km || 
|-id=743 bgcolor=#E9E9E9
| 491743 ||  || — || October 20, 2012 || Mount Lemmon || Mount Lemmon Survey || — || align=right | 1.4 km || 
|-id=744 bgcolor=#fefefe
| 491744 ||  || — || November 7, 2012 || Mount Lemmon || Mount Lemmon Survey || — || align=right data-sort-value="0.60" | 600 m || 
|-id=745 bgcolor=#d6d6d6
| 491745 ||  || — || August 29, 2006 || Kitt Peak || Spacewatch || — || align=right | 2.3 km || 
|-id=746 bgcolor=#E9E9E9
| 491746 ||  || — || December 22, 2008 || Kitt Peak || Spacewatch || — || align=right | 1.0 km || 
|-id=747 bgcolor=#d6d6d6
| 491747 ||  || — || May 7, 2010 || Mount Lemmon || Mount Lemmon Survey || VER || align=right | 2.4 km || 
|-id=748 bgcolor=#E9E9E9
| 491748 ||  || — || September 12, 2007 || Mount Lemmon || Mount Lemmon Survey || — || align=right | 1.3 km || 
|-id=749 bgcolor=#E9E9E9
| 491749 ||  || — || October 21, 2012 || Haleakala || Pan-STARRS || — || align=right | 1.9 km || 
|-id=750 bgcolor=#fefefe
| 491750 ||  || — || October 21, 2012 || Kitt Peak || Spacewatch || — || align=right data-sort-value="0.57" | 570 m || 
|-id=751 bgcolor=#fefefe
| 491751 ||  || — || December 22, 2005 || Kitt Peak || Spacewatch || MAS || align=right data-sort-value="0.59" | 590 m || 
|-id=752 bgcolor=#E9E9E9
| 491752 ||  || — || October 21, 2012 || Haleakala || Pan-STARRS || — || align=right | 1.3 km || 
|-id=753 bgcolor=#E9E9E9
| 491753 ||  || — || May 24, 2011 || Mount Lemmon || Mount Lemmon Survey || — || align=right data-sort-value="0.94" | 940 m || 
|-id=754 bgcolor=#d6d6d6
| 491754 ||  || — || October 21, 2012 || Haleakala || Pan-STARRS || EOS || align=right | 1.5 km || 
|-id=755 bgcolor=#FA8072
| 491755 ||  || — || January 17, 2009 || Kitt Peak || Spacewatch || — || align=right data-sort-value="0.96" | 960 m || 
|-id=756 bgcolor=#E9E9E9
| 491756 ||  || — || November 4, 2012 || Kitt Peak || Spacewatch || — || align=right | 1.5 km || 
|-id=757 bgcolor=#d6d6d6
| 491757 ||  || — || August 4, 2011 || Haleakala || Pan-STARRS || — || align=right | 3.2 km || 
|-id=758 bgcolor=#d6d6d6
| 491758 ||  || — || October 22, 2012 || Mount Lemmon || Mount Lemmon Survey || EOS || align=right | 1.8 km || 
|-id=759 bgcolor=#E9E9E9
| 491759 ||  || — || November 19, 2008 || Kitt Peak || Spacewatch || — || align=right data-sort-value="0.70" | 700 m || 
|-id=760 bgcolor=#fefefe
| 491760 ||  || — || October 26, 2012 || Mount Lemmon || Mount Lemmon Survey || — || align=right data-sort-value="0.65" | 650 m || 
|-id=761 bgcolor=#E9E9E9
| 491761 ||  || — || September 22, 2003 || Kitt Peak || Spacewatch || — || align=right | 1.2 km || 
|-id=762 bgcolor=#E9E9E9
| 491762 ||  || — || November 4, 2012 || Kitt Peak || Spacewatch || — || align=right | 2.6 km || 
|-id=763 bgcolor=#fefefe
| 491763 ||  || — || October 21, 2012 || Haleakala || Pan-STARRS || — || align=right data-sort-value="0.81" | 810 m || 
|-id=764 bgcolor=#d6d6d6
| 491764 ||  || — || October 17, 1995 || Kitt Peak || Spacewatch || — || align=right | 2.6 km || 
|-id=765 bgcolor=#FA8072
| 491765 ||  || — || December 6, 2002 || Socorro || LINEAR || — || align=right data-sort-value="0.50" | 500 m || 
|-id=766 bgcolor=#E9E9E9
| 491766 ||  || — || October 21, 2012 || Haleakala || Pan-STARRS || — || align=right | 1.2 km || 
|-id=767 bgcolor=#C2E0FF
| 491767 ||  || — || November 15, 2012 || Cerro Tololo-DECam || CTIO-DES || plutinocritical || align=right | 124 km || 
|-id=768 bgcolor=#C2E0FF
| 491768 ||  || — || November 15, 2012 || Cerro Tololo-DECam || CTIO-DES || cubewano?critical || align=right | 147 km || 
|-id=769 bgcolor=#E9E9E9
| 491769 ||  || — || August 19, 2003 || Campo Imperatore || CINEOS || — || align=right | 1.3 km || 
|-id=770 bgcolor=#FA8072
| 491770 ||  || — || November 5, 2012 || Kitt Peak || Spacewatch || — || align=right | 1.5 km || 
|-id=771 bgcolor=#fefefe
| 491771 ||  || — || January 26, 2006 || Kitt Peak || Spacewatch || — || align=right data-sort-value="0.71" | 710 m || 
|-id=772 bgcolor=#fefefe
| 491772 ||  || — || October 1, 2005 || Kitt Peak || Spacewatch || — || align=right data-sort-value="0.61" | 610 m || 
|-id=773 bgcolor=#E9E9E9
| 491773 ||  || — || October 9, 2012 || Mount Lemmon || Mount Lemmon Survey || — || align=right | 2.1 km || 
|-id=774 bgcolor=#E9E9E9
| 491774 ||  || — || November 14, 2012 || Kitt Peak || Spacewatch || — || align=right | 2.1 km || 
|-id=775 bgcolor=#d6d6d6
| 491775 ||  || — || August 21, 2011 || Haleakala || Pan-STARRS || — || align=right | 2.9 km || 
|-id=776 bgcolor=#d6d6d6
| 491776 ||  || — || September 25, 2006 || Kitt Peak || Spacewatch || VER || align=right | 2.1 km || 
|-id=777 bgcolor=#E9E9E9
| 491777 ||  || — || February 9, 2005 || Mount Lemmon || Mount Lemmon Survey || MIS || align=right | 1.8 km || 
|-id=778 bgcolor=#E9E9E9
| 491778 ||  || — || October 26, 2012 || Mount Lemmon || Mount Lemmon Survey || (5) || align=right data-sort-value="0.51" | 510 m || 
|-id=779 bgcolor=#E9E9E9
| 491779 ||  || — || November 30, 2008 || Kitt Peak || Spacewatch || (5) || align=right data-sort-value="0.74" | 740 m || 
|-id=780 bgcolor=#E9E9E9
| 491780 ||  || — || October 15, 2007 || Mount Lemmon || Mount Lemmon Survey || AGN || align=right | 1.00 km || 
|-id=781 bgcolor=#d6d6d6
| 491781 ||  || — || November 4, 2004 || Catalina || CSS || SHU3:2 || align=right | 5.8 km || 
|-id=782 bgcolor=#fefefe
| 491782 ||  || — || November 30, 2005 || Kitt Peak || Spacewatch || NYS || align=right data-sort-value="0.48" | 480 m || 
|-id=783 bgcolor=#fefefe
| 491783 ||  || — || January 11, 2010 || Kitt Peak || Spacewatch || — || align=right data-sort-value="0.67" | 670 m || 
|-id=784 bgcolor=#E9E9E9
| 491784 ||  || — || September 22, 2003 || Kitt Peak || Spacewatch || — || align=right | 1.1 km || 
|-id=785 bgcolor=#E9E9E9
| 491785 ||  || — || November 21, 2008 || Kitt Peak || Spacewatch || critical || align=right data-sort-value="0.57" | 570 m || 
|-id=786 bgcolor=#E9E9E9
| 491786 ||  || — || November 23, 2012 || Kitt Peak || Spacewatch || AGN || align=right | 1.0 km || 
|-id=787 bgcolor=#fefefe
| 491787 ||  || — || November 21, 2009 || Mount Lemmon || Mount Lemmon Survey || — || align=right data-sort-value="0.82" | 820 m || 
|-id=788 bgcolor=#fefefe
| 491788 ||  || — || September 19, 2008 || Kitt Peak || Spacewatch || NYS || align=right data-sort-value="0.55" | 550 m || 
|-id=789 bgcolor=#d6d6d6
| 491789 ||  || — || December 4, 2007 || Kitt Peak || Spacewatch || — || align=right | 2.0 km || 
|-id=790 bgcolor=#d6d6d6
| 491790 ||  || — || October 14, 2012 || Kitt Peak || Spacewatch || — || align=right | 2.4 km || 
|-id=791 bgcolor=#E9E9E9
| 491791 ||  || — || October 22, 2012 || Haleakala || Pan-STARRS || — || align=right | 1.9 km || 
|-id=792 bgcolor=#E9E9E9
| 491792 ||  || — || September 11, 2007 || Mount Lemmon || Mount Lemmon Survey || MRX || align=right data-sort-value="0.76" | 760 m || 
|-id=793 bgcolor=#fefefe
| 491793 ||  || — || March 10, 2007 || Kitt Peak || Spacewatch || — || align=right data-sort-value="0.61" | 610 m || 
|-id=794 bgcolor=#d6d6d6
| 491794 ||  || — || September 18, 2006 || Kitt Peak || Spacewatch || — || align=right | 2.8 km || 
|-id=795 bgcolor=#d6d6d6
| 491795 ||  || — || January 22, 2006 || Mount Lemmon || Mount Lemmon Survey || 3:2 || align=right | 2.7 km || 
|-id=796 bgcolor=#E9E9E9
| 491796 ||  || — || November 17, 2008 || Kitt Peak || Spacewatch || critical || align=right data-sort-value="0.59" | 590 m || 
|-id=797 bgcolor=#fefefe
| 491797 ||  || — || December 3, 2012 || Mount Lemmon || Mount Lemmon Survey || — || align=right data-sort-value="0.59" | 590 m || 
|-id=798 bgcolor=#d6d6d6
| 491798 ||  || — || November 15, 2012 || Mount Lemmon || Mount Lemmon Survey || — || align=right | 3.1 km || 
|-id=799 bgcolor=#E9E9E9
| 491799 ||  || — || October 22, 2012 || Haleakala || Pan-STARRS || — || align=right | 1.8 km || 
|-id=800 bgcolor=#fefefe
| 491800 ||  || — || October 18, 2008 || Kitt Peak || Spacewatch || NYS || align=right data-sort-value="0.50" | 500 m || 
|}

491801–491900 

|-bgcolor=#fefefe
| 491801 ||  || — || December 4, 2012 || Mount Lemmon || Mount Lemmon Survey || — || align=right data-sort-value="0.56" | 560 m || 
|-id=802 bgcolor=#E9E9E9
| 491802 ||  || — || November 4, 2012 || Kitt Peak || Spacewatch || (5) || align=right data-sort-value="0.64" | 640 m || 
|-id=803 bgcolor=#fefefe
| 491803 ||  || — || November 7, 2012 || Mount Lemmon || Mount Lemmon Survey || — || align=right data-sort-value="0.75" | 750 m || 
|-id=804 bgcolor=#fefefe
| 491804 ||  || — || September 23, 2008 || Kitt Peak || Spacewatch || — || align=right data-sort-value="0.68" | 680 m || 
|-id=805 bgcolor=#d6d6d6
| 491805 ||  || — || October 31, 2006 || Mount Lemmon || Mount Lemmon Survey || — || align=right | 2.9 km || 
|-id=806 bgcolor=#fefefe
| 491806 ||  || — || November 22, 2012 || Kitt Peak || Spacewatch || — || align=right data-sort-value="0.81" | 810 m || 
|-id=807 bgcolor=#E9E9E9
| 491807 ||  || — || May 30, 2011 || Haleakala || Pan-STARRS || (5) || align=right data-sort-value="0.89" | 890 m || 
|-id=808 bgcolor=#fefefe
| 491808 ||  || — || October 8, 2012 || Mount Lemmon || Mount Lemmon Survey || — || align=right data-sort-value="0.45" | 450 m || 
|-id=809 bgcolor=#E9E9E9
| 491809 ||  || — || September 2, 2011 || Haleakala || Pan-STARRS || — || align=right | 2.2 km || 
|-id=810 bgcolor=#fefefe
| 491810 ||  || — || October 9, 2008 || Mount Lemmon || Mount Lemmon Survey || MAS || align=right data-sort-value="0.49" | 490 m || 
|-id=811 bgcolor=#E9E9E9
| 491811 ||  || — || October 12, 2007 || Catalina || CSS || — || align=right | 1.9 km || 
|-id=812 bgcolor=#fefefe
| 491812 ||  || — || October 20, 2012 || Kitt Peak || Spacewatch || — || align=right data-sort-value="0.60" | 600 m || 
|-id=813 bgcolor=#E9E9E9
| 491813 ||  || — || October 9, 2007 || Catalina || CSS || — || align=right | 2.4 km || 
|-id=814 bgcolor=#fefefe
| 491814 ||  || — || August 30, 2005 || Kitt Peak || Spacewatch || critical || align=right data-sort-value="0.47" | 470 m || 
|-id=815 bgcolor=#fefefe
| 491815 ||  || — || December 8, 2012 || Mount Lemmon || Mount Lemmon Survey || — || align=right data-sort-value="0.56" | 560 m || 
|-id=816 bgcolor=#fefefe
| 491816 ||  || — || September 30, 2005 || Anderson Mesa || LONEOS || — || align=right data-sort-value="0.53" | 530 m || 
|-id=817 bgcolor=#C2FFFF
| 491817 ||  || — || January 3, 2013 || Haleakala || Pan-STARRS || L4 || align=right | 8.9 km || 
|-id=818 bgcolor=#d6d6d6
| 491818 ||  || — || August 30, 2011 || Haleakala || Pan-STARRS || — || align=right | 3.6 km || 
|-id=819 bgcolor=#fefefe
| 491819 ||  || — || January 3, 2013 || Mount Lemmon || Mount Lemmon Survey || NYS || align=right data-sort-value="0.61" | 610 m || 
|-id=820 bgcolor=#fefefe
| 491820 ||  || — || March 25, 2006 || Kitt Peak || Spacewatch || — || align=right data-sort-value="0.64" | 640 m || 
|-id=821 bgcolor=#fefefe
| 491821 ||  || — || November 25, 2005 || Kitt Peak || Spacewatch || — || align=right data-sort-value="0.51" | 510 m || 
|-id=822 bgcolor=#fefefe
| 491822 ||  || — || September 28, 2008 || Mount Lemmon || Mount Lemmon Survey || V || align=right data-sort-value="0.71" | 710 m || 
|-id=823 bgcolor=#fefefe
| 491823 ||  || — || September 25, 2008 || Kitt Peak || Spacewatch || — || align=right data-sort-value="0.62" | 620 m || 
|-id=824 bgcolor=#d6d6d6
| 491824 ||  || — || November 27, 2006 || Kitt Peak || Spacewatch || THM || align=right | 2.2 km || 
|-id=825 bgcolor=#fefefe
| 491825 ||  || — || December 9, 2012 || Mount Lemmon || Mount Lemmon Survey || — || align=right data-sort-value="0.70" | 700 m || 
|-id=826 bgcolor=#fefefe
| 491826 ||  || — || July 27, 2011 || Haleakala || Pan-STARRS || — || align=right data-sort-value="0.75" | 750 m || 
|-id=827 bgcolor=#fefefe
| 491827 ||  || — || December 9, 2012 || Mount Lemmon || Mount Lemmon Survey || NYS || align=right data-sort-value="0.60" | 600 m || 
|-id=828 bgcolor=#d6d6d6
| 491828 ||  || — || January 5, 2013 || Kitt Peak || Spacewatch || — || align=right | 3.0 km || 
|-id=829 bgcolor=#fefefe
| 491829 ||  || — || December 17, 2001 || Socorro || LINEAR || — || align=right data-sort-value="0.68" | 680 m || 
|-id=830 bgcolor=#E9E9E9
| 491830 ||  || — || November 13, 2012 || Mount Lemmon || Mount Lemmon Survey || — || align=right | 2.3 km || 
|-id=831 bgcolor=#E9E9E9
| 491831 ||  || — || August 30, 2011 || Haleakala || Pan-STARRS || — || align=right | 2.2 km || 
|-id=832 bgcolor=#d6d6d6
| 491832 ||  || — || September 28, 2006 || Kitt Peak || Spacewatch || — || align=right | 2.3 km || 
|-id=833 bgcolor=#E9E9E9
| 491833 ||  || — || September 19, 2011 || Haleakala || Pan-STARRS || — || align=right | 2.5 km || 
|-id=834 bgcolor=#C2FFFF
| 491834 ||  || — || October 30, 2010 || Mount Lemmon || Mount Lemmon Survey || L4 || align=right | 7.1 km || 
|-id=835 bgcolor=#fefefe
| 491835 ||  || — || November 2, 2008 || Kitt Peak || Spacewatch || — || align=right data-sort-value="0.68" | 680 m || 
|-id=836 bgcolor=#fefefe
| 491836 ||  || — || January 5, 2013 || Kitt Peak || Spacewatch || NYS || align=right data-sort-value="0.72" | 720 m || 
|-id=837 bgcolor=#fefefe
| 491837 ||  || — || January 5, 2013 || Mount Lemmon || Mount Lemmon Survey || — || align=right data-sort-value="0.85" | 850 m || 
|-id=838 bgcolor=#d6d6d6
| 491838 ||  || — || January 5, 2013 || Mount Lemmon || Mount Lemmon Survey || — || align=right | 3.7 km || 
|-id=839 bgcolor=#fefefe
| 491839 ||  || — || November 1, 2008 || Mount Lemmon || Mount Lemmon Survey || — || align=right data-sort-value="0.64" | 640 m || 
|-id=840 bgcolor=#fefefe
| 491840 ||  || — || October 21, 2008 || Mount Lemmon || Mount Lemmon Survey || — || align=right data-sort-value="0.82" | 820 m || 
|-id=841 bgcolor=#E9E9E9
| 491841 ||  || — || January 7, 2013 || Mount Lemmon || Mount Lemmon Survey || — || align=right | 1.8 km || 
|-id=842 bgcolor=#FFC2E0
| 491842 ||  || — || January 7, 2013 || Haleakala || Pan-STARRS || AMO +1kmcritical || align=right data-sort-value="0.81" | 810 m || 
|-id=843 bgcolor=#d6d6d6
| 491843 ||  || — || September 27, 2012 || Haleakala || Pan-STARRS || — || align=right | 4.1 km || 
|-id=844 bgcolor=#fefefe
| 491844 ||  || — || December 2, 2008 || Kitt Peak || Spacewatch || NYS || align=right data-sort-value="0.60" | 600 m || 
|-id=845 bgcolor=#E9E9E9
| 491845 ||  || — || December 29, 2008 || Mount Lemmon || Mount Lemmon Survey || — || align=right | 1.2 km || 
|-id=846 bgcolor=#E9E9E9
| 491846 ||  || — || December 20, 2008 || La Sagra || OAM Obs. || — || align=right | 1.2 km || 
|-id=847 bgcolor=#E9E9E9
| 491847 ||  || — || September 28, 2003 || Kitt Peak || Spacewatch || critical || align=right data-sort-value="0.96" | 960 m || 
|-id=848 bgcolor=#fefefe
| 491848 ||  || — || December 6, 2005 || Kitt Peak || Spacewatch || — || align=right data-sort-value="0.67" | 670 m || 
|-id=849 bgcolor=#fefefe
| 491849 ||  || — || December 7, 2012 || Haleakala || Pan-STARRS || — || align=right | 1.1 km || 
|-id=850 bgcolor=#fefefe
| 491850 ||  || — || December 11, 2012 || Kitt Peak || Spacewatch || V || align=right data-sort-value="0.57" | 570 m || 
|-id=851 bgcolor=#fefefe
| 491851 ||  || — || December 23, 2012 || Haleakala || Pan-STARRS || — || align=right data-sort-value="0.67" | 670 m || 
|-id=852 bgcolor=#fefefe
| 491852 ||  || — || December 22, 2012 || Haleakala || Pan-STARRS || — || align=right data-sort-value="0.88" | 880 m || 
|-id=853 bgcolor=#d6d6d6
| 491853 ||  || — || January 10, 2013 || Haleakala || Pan-STARRS || — || align=right | 2.0 km || 
|-id=854 bgcolor=#fefefe
| 491854 ||  || — || January 10, 2013 || Haleakala || Pan-STARRS || — || align=right data-sort-value="0.72" | 720 m || 
|-id=855 bgcolor=#E9E9E9
| 491855 ||  || — || September 16, 2003 || Kitt Peak || Spacewatch || — || align=right | 1.1 km || 
|-id=856 bgcolor=#fefefe
| 491856 ||  || — || November 13, 2012 || Mount Lemmon || Mount Lemmon Survey || — || align=right data-sort-value="0.74" | 740 m || 
|-id=857 bgcolor=#E9E9E9
| 491857 ||  || — || September 4, 2011 || Haleakala || Pan-STARRS || — || align=right | 2.2 km || 
|-id=858 bgcolor=#E9E9E9
| 491858 ||  || — || January 15, 2004 || Kitt Peak || Spacewatch || — || align=right | 1.3 km || 
|-id=859 bgcolor=#fefefe
| 491859 ||  || — || December 7, 2005 || Kitt Peak || Spacewatch || — || align=right data-sort-value="0.59" | 590 m || 
|-id=860 bgcolor=#fefefe
| 491860 ||  || — || July 27, 2011 || Haleakala || Pan-STARRS || V || align=right data-sort-value="0.57" | 570 m || 
|-id=861 bgcolor=#fefefe
| 491861 ||  || — || September 4, 2008 || Kitt Peak || Spacewatch || — || align=right data-sort-value="0.57" | 570 m || 
|-id=862 bgcolor=#E9E9E9
| 491862 ||  || — || January 6, 2013 || Kitt Peak || Spacewatch || — || align=right | 1.4 km || 
|-id=863 bgcolor=#d6d6d6
| 491863 ||  || — || October 24, 2011 || Haleakala || Pan-STARRS || — || align=right | 2.9 km || 
|-id=864 bgcolor=#d6d6d6
| 491864 ||  || — || November 11, 2006 || Kitt Peak || Spacewatch || LIX || align=right | 2.5 km || 
|-id=865 bgcolor=#d6d6d6
| 491865 ||  || — || April 6, 2008 || Mount Lemmon || Mount Lemmon Survey || — || align=right | 1.8 km || 
|-id=866 bgcolor=#fefefe
| 491866 ||  || — || May 22, 2006 || Kitt Peak || Spacewatch || — || align=right data-sort-value="0.71" | 710 m || 
|-id=867 bgcolor=#E9E9E9
| 491867 ||  || — || October 19, 2011 || Mount Lemmon || Mount Lemmon Survey || — || align=right | 1.1 km || 
|-id=868 bgcolor=#C2FFFF
| 491868 ||  || — || September 28, 2009 || Kitt Peak || Spacewatch || L4 || align=right | 6.9 km || 
|-id=869 bgcolor=#fefefe
| 491869 ||  || — || September 20, 2008 || Mount Lemmon || Mount Lemmon Survey || — || align=right data-sort-value="0.96" | 960 m || 
|-id=870 bgcolor=#E9E9E9
| 491870 ||  || — || July 28, 2011 || Haleakala || Pan-STARRS || RAF || align=right data-sort-value="0.89" | 890 m || 
|-id=871 bgcolor=#fefefe
| 491871 ||  || — || January 26, 2006 || Mount Lemmon || Mount Lemmon Survey || — || align=right data-sort-value="0.64" | 640 m || 
|-id=872 bgcolor=#fefefe
| 491872 ||  || — || January 30, 2006 || Kitt Peak || Spacewatch || — || align=right data-sort-value="0.62" | 620 m || 
|-id=873 bgcolor=#fefefe
| 491873 ||  || — || January 5, 2013 || Mount Lemmon || Mount Lemmon Survey || — || align=right data-sort-value="0.98" | 980 m || 
|-id=874 bgcolor=#fefefe
| 491874 ||  || — || July 2, 2010 || WISE || WISE || — || align=right | 2.1 km || 
|-id=875 bgcolor=#C2FFFF
| 491875 ||  || — || December 22, 2012 || Haleakala || Pan-STARRS || L4 || align=right | 9.9 km || 
|-id=876 bgcolor=#fefefe
| 491876 ||  || — || July 27, 2011 || Haleakala || Pan-STARRS || — || align=right data-sort-value="0.72" | 720 m || 
|-id=877 bgcolor=#d6d6d6
| 491877 ||  || — || September 25, 2011 || Haleakala || Pan-STARRS || — || align=right | 2.9 km || 
|-id=878 bgcolor=#E9E9E9
| 491878 ||  || — || December 23, 2012 || Haleakala || Pan-STARRS || — || align=right | 1.2 km || 
|-id=879 bgcolor=#fefefe
| 491879 ||  || — || January 16, 2013 || Haleakala || Pan-STARRS || — || align=right data-sort-value="0.74" | 740 m || 
|-id=880 bgcolor=#E9E9E9
| 491880 ||  || — || September 4, 2011 || Haleakala || Pan-STARRS || — || align=right | 2.4 km || 
|-id=881 bgcolor=#fefefe
| 491881 ||  || — || November 6, 2008 || Mount Lemmon || Mount Lemmon Survey || — || align=right data-sort-value="0.57" | 570 m || 
|-id=882 bgcolor=#C2FFFF
| 491882 ||  || — || October 9, 2010 || Haleakala || Pan-STARRS || L4 || align=right | 5.9 km || 
|-id=883 bgcolor=#fefefe
| 491883 ||  || — || January 7, 2006 || Mount Lemmon || Mount Lemmon Survey || — || align=right data-sort-value="0.78" | 780 m || 
|-id=884 bgcolor=#fefefe
| 491884 ||  || — || December 21, 2008 || Kitt Peak || Spacewatch || MAS || align=right data-sort-value="0.65" | 650 m || 
|-id=885 bgcolor=#fefefe
| 491885 ||  || — || February 27, 2006 || Kitt Peak || Spacewatch || NYS || align=right data-sort-value="0.54" | 540 m || 
|-id=886 bgcolor=#E9E9E9
| 491886 ||  || — || January 18, 2013 || Kitt Peak || Spacewatch || — || align=right | 1.0 km || 
|-id=887 bgcolor=#fefefe
| 491887 ||  || — || February 27, 2006 || Mount Lemmon || Mount Lemmon Survey || — || align=right data-sort-value="0.59" | 590 m || 
|-id=888 bgcolor=#d6d6d6
| 491888 ||  || — || December 1, 2006 || Kitt Peak || Spacewatch || — || align=right | 3.1 km || 
|-id=889 bgcolor=#fefefe
| 491889 ||  || — || November 2, 2008 || Mount Lemmon || Mount Lemmon Survey || — || align=right data-sort-value="0.62" | 620 m || 
|-id=890 bgcolor=#d6d6d6
| 491890 ||  || — || January 10, 2013 || Haleakala || Pan-STARRS || — || align=right | 3.2 km || 
|-id=891 bgcolor=#fefefe
| 491891 ||  || — || January 10, 2013 || Haleakala || Pan-STARRS || — || align=right data-sort-value="0.75" | 750 m || 
|-id=892 bgcolor=#d6d6d6
| 491892 ||  || — || July 27, 2011 || Haleakala || Pan-STARRS || — || align=right | 2.1 km || 
|-id=893 bgcolor=#fefefe
| 491893 ||  || — || September 8, 2011 || Haleakala || Pan-STARRS || — || align=right data-sort-value="0.74" | 740 m || 
|-id=894 bgcolor=#E9E9E9
| 491894 ||  || — || September 15, 2011 || Haleakala || Pan-STARRS || DOR || align=right | 1.8 km || 
|-id=895 bgcolor=#fefefe
| 491895 ||  || — || November 1, 2007 || Mount Lemmon || Mount Lemmon Survey || — || align=right data-sort-value="0.73" | 730 m || 
|-id=896 bgcolor=#d6d6d6
| 491896 ||  || — || March 4, 2008 || Kitt Peak || Spacewatch || EOS || align=right | 1.6 km || 
|-id=897 bgcolor=#fefefe
| 491897 ||  || — || September 29, 2011 || Mount Lemmon || Mount Lemmon Survey || — || align=right data-sort-value="0.98" | 980 m || 
|-id=898 bgcolor=#fefefe
| 491898 ||  || — || January 19, 2013 || Kitt Peak || Spacewatch || NYS || align=right data-sort-value="0.50" | 500 m || 
|-id=899 bgcolor=#fefefe
| 491899 ||  || — || January 9, 2013 || Kitt Peak || Spacewatch || NYS || align=right data-sort-value="0.49" | 490 m || 
|-id=900 bgcolor=#d6d6d6
| 491900 ||  || — || January 6, 2013 || Kitt Peak || Spacewatch || — || align=right | 2.9 km || 
|}

491901–492000 

|-bgcolor=#fefefe
| 491901 ||  || — || December 1, 2008 || Mount Lemmon || Mount Lemmon Survey || V || align=right data-sort-value="0.72" | 720 m || 
|-id=902 bgcolor=#fefefe
| 491902 ||  || — || February 1, 2013 || Kitt Peak || Spacewatch || — || align=right data-sort-value="0.65" | 650 m || 
|-id=903 bgcolor=#E9E9E9
| 491903 ||  || — || March 29, 2001 || Kitt Peak || Spacewatch || — || align=right data-sort-value="0.60" | 600 m || 
|-id=904 bgcolor=#fefefe
| 491904 ||  || — || December 1, 2008 || Kitt Peak || Spacewatch || — || align=right data-sort-value="0.73" | 730 m || 
|-id=905 bgcolor=#d6d6d6
| 491905 ||  || — || December 13, 2006 || Kitt Peak || Spacewatch || — || align=right | 2.2 km || 
|-id=906 bgcolor=#d6d6d6
| 491906 ||  || — || March 30, 2008 || Kitt Peak || Spacewatch || EOS || align=right | 1.4 km || 
|-id=907 bgcolor=#fefefe
| 491907 ||  || — || September 30, 2011 || Kitt Peak || Spacewatch || — || align=right data-sort-value="0.70" | 700 m || 
|-id=908 bgcolor=#fefefe
| 491908 ||  || — || April 29, 2003 || Kitt Peak || Spacewatch || — || align=right data-sort-value="0.82" | 820 m || 
|-id=909 bgcolor=#fefefe
| 491909 ||  || — || October 24, 2011 || Mount Lemmon || Mount Lemmon Survey || — || align=right data-sort-value="0.82" | 820 m || 
|-id=910 bgcolor=#E9E9E9
| 491910 ||  || — || September 4, 2011 || Haleakala || Pan-STARRS || — || align=right | 1.8 km || 
|-id=911 bgcolor=#fefefe
| 491911 ||  || — || December 31, 2008 || Kitt Peak || Spacewatch || — || align=right data-sort-value="0.86" | 860 m || 
|-id=912 bgcolor=#d6d6d6
| 491912 ||  || — || February 7, 2013 || Kitt Peak || Spacewatch || — || align=right | 2.7 km || 
|-id=913 bgcolor=#fefefe
| 491913 ||  || — || December 31, 2008 || Kitt Peak || Spacewatch || — || align=right data-sort-value="0.71" | 710 m || 
|-id=914 bgcolor=#d6d6d6
| 491914 ||  || — || October 18, 2011 || Kitt Peak || Spacewatch || — || align=right | 2.9 km || 
|-id=915 bgcolor=#fefefe
| 491915 ||  || — || February 8, 2013 || Haleakala || Pan-STARRS || — || align=right data-sort-value="0.87" | 870 m || 
|-id=916 bgcolor=#fefefe
| 491916 ||  || — || August 23, 2011 || Haleakala || Pan-STARRS || V || align=right data-sort-value="0.58" | 580 m || 
|-id=917 bgcolor=#fefefe
| 491917 ||  || — || September 18, 2011 || Mount Lemmon || Mount Lemmon Survey || — || align=right data-sort-value="0.67" | 670 m || 
|-id=918 bgcolor=#d6d6d6
| 491918 ||  || — || September 30, 2006 || Mount Lemmon || Mount Lemmon Survey || — || align=right | 2.6 km || 
|-id=919 bgcolor=#E9E9E9
| 491919 ||  || — || August 30, 2011 || Haleakala || Pan-STARRS || — || align=right | 2.2 km || 
|-id=920 bgcolor=#E9E9E9
| 491920 ||  || — || January 10, 2013 || Kitt Peak || Spacewatch || EUN || align=right | 1.1 km || 
|-id=921 bgcolor=#d6d6d6
| 491921 ||  || — || September 19, 2011 || Haleakala || Pan-STARRS || — || align=right | 3.1 km || 
|-id=922 bgcolor=#E9E9E9
| 491922 ||  || — || September 23, 2011 || Kitt Peak || Spacewatch || — || align=right | 2.0 km || 
|-id=923 bgcolor=#d6d6d6
| 491923 ||  || — || February 8, 2013 || Haleakala || Pan-STARRS || — || align=right | 2.7 km || 
|-id=924 bgcolor=#fefefe
| 491924 ||  || — || January 30, 2009 || Kitt Peak || Spacewatch || — || align=right data-sort-value="0.67" | 670 m || 
|-id=925 bgcolor=#fefefe
| 491925 ||  || — || December 23, 2012 || Haleakala || Pan-STARRS || — || align=right data-sort-value="0.56" | 560 m || 
|-id=926 bgcolor=#E9E9E9
| 491926 ||  || — || August 24, 2011 || Haleakala || Pan-STARRS || — || align=right | 2.2 km || 
|-id=927 bgcolor=#fefefe
| 491927 ||  || — || February 8, 2013 || Kitt Peak || Spacewatch || MAS || align=right data-sort-value="0.75" | 750 m || 
|-id=928 bgcolor=#fefefe
| 491928 ||  || — || September 23, 2011 || Haleakala || Pan-STARRS || — || align=right data-sort-value="0.84" | 840 m || 
|-id=929 bgcolor=#fefefe
| 491929 ||  || — || April 21, 2006 || Catalina || CSS || — || align=right data-sort-value="0.68" | 680 m || 
|-id=930 bgcolor=#fefefe
| 491930 ||  || — || February 8, 2013 || Haleakala || Pan-STARRS || V || align=right data-sort-value="0.54" | 540 m || 
|-id=931 bgcolor=#fefefe
| 491931 ||  || — || April 6, 1995 || Kitt Peak || Spacewatch || NYS || align=right data-sort-value="0.50" | 500 m || 
|-id=932 bgcolor=#fefefe
| 491932 ||  || — || November 24, 2008 || Kitt Peak || Spacewatch || — || align=right data-sort-value="0.66" | 660 m || 
|-id=933 bgcolor=#E9E9E9
| 491933 ||  || — || February 9, 2013 || Haleakala || Pan-STARRS || — || align=right | 2.4 km || 
|-id=934 bgcolor=#fefefe
| 491934 ||  || — || January 12, 2002 || Kitt Peak || Spacewatch || — || align=right data-sort-value="0.57" | 570 m || 
|-id=935 bgcolor=#fefefe
| 491935 ||  || — || February 6, 2013 || Kitt Peak || Spacewatch || — || align=right data-sort-value="0.75" | 750 m || 
|-id=936 bgcolor=#fefefe
| 491936 ||  || — || February 9, 2013 || Haleakala || Pan-STARRS || — || align=right data-sort-value="0.71" | 710 m || 
|-id=937 bgcolor=#C2FFFF
| 491937 ||  || — || September 21, 2009 || Mount Lemmon || Mount Lemmon Survey || L4 || align=right | 8.2 km || 
|-id=938 bgcolor=#fefefe
| 491938 ||  || — || February 9, 2013 || Haleakala || Pan-STARRS || — || align=right data-sort-value="0.90" | 900 m || 
|-id=939 bgcolor=#fefefe
| 491939 ||  || — || November 19, 2008 || Kitt Peak || Spacewatch || — || align=right data-sort-value="0.52" | 520 m || 
|-id=940 bgcolor=#fefefe
| 491940 ||  || — || February 12, 2013 || Haleakala || Pan-STARRS || — || align=right data-sort-value="0.73" | 730 m || 
|-id=941 bgcolor=#fefefe
| 491941 ||  || — || September 19, 2003 || Kitt Peak || Spacewatch || — || align=right | 1.0 km || 
|-id=942 bgcolor=#fefefe
| 491942 ||  || — || January 15, 2009 || Kitt Peak || Spacewatch || MAS || align=right data-sort-value="0.58" | 580 m || 
|-id=943 bgcolor=#fefefe
| 491943 ||  || — || October 11, 2004 || Kitt Peak || Spacewatch || — || align=right data-sort-value="0.65" | 650 m || 
|-id=944 bgcolor=#E9E9E9
| 491944 ||  || — || March 3, 2009 || Mount Lemmon || Mount Lemmon Survey || — || align=right | 1.2 km || 
|-id=945 bgcolor=#fefefe
| 491945 ||  || — || January 9, 2013 || Mount Lemmon || Mount Lemmon Survey || NYS || align=right data-sort-value="0.58" | 580 m || 
|-id=946 bgcolor=#d6d6d6
| 491946 ||  || — || March 15, 2008 || Mount Lemmon || Mount Lemmon Survey || — || align=right | 2.1 km || 
|-id=947 bgcolor=#fefefe
| 491947 ||  || — || March 13, 2002 || Kitt Peak || Spacewatch || — || align=right data-sort-value="0.64" | 640 m || 
|-id=948 bgcolor=#fefefe
| 491948 ||  || — || December 31, 2008 || Kitt Peak || Spacewatch || V || align=right data-sort-value="0.65" | 650 m || 
|-id=949 bgcolor=#fefefe
| 491949 ||  || — || February 5, 2013 || Kitt Peak || Spacewatch || NYS || align=right data-sort-value="0.55" | 550 m || 
|-id=950 bgcolor=#fefefe
| 491950 ||  || — || January 9, 2013 || Mount Lemmon || Mount Lemmon Survey || — || align=right data-sort-value="0.67" | 670 m || 
|-id=951 bgcolor=#fefefe
| 491951 ||  || — || February 5, 2013 || Kitt Peak || Spacewatch || MAS || align=right data-sort-value="0.65" | 650 m || 
|-id=952 bgcolor=#fefefe
| 491952 ||  || — || May 21, 2006 || Kitt Peak || Spacewatch || MAS || align=right data-sort-value="0.62" | 620 m || 
|-id=953 bgcolor=#fefefe
| 491953 ||  || — || February 6, 2013 || Kitt Peak || Spacewatch || — || align=right data-sort-value="0.78" | 780 m || 
|-id=954 bgcolor=#fefefe
| 491954 ||  || — || November 30, 2008 || Kitt Peak || Spacewatch || NYS || align=right data-sort-value="0.66" | 660 m || 
|-id=955 bgcolor=#fefefe
| 491955 ||  || — || December 1, 2008 || Kitt Peak || Spacewatch || — || align=right data-sort-value="0.78" | 780 m || 
|-id=956 bgcolor=#E9E9E9
| 491956 ||  || — || January 25, 2009 || Kitt Peak || Spacewatch || — || align=right data-sort-value="0.93" | 930 m || 
|-id=957 bgcolor=#fefefe
| 491957 ||  || — || October 8, 2004 || Kitt Peak || Spacewatch || NYS || align=right data-sort-value="0.56" | 560 m || 
|-id=958 bgcolor=#d6d6d6
| 491958 ||  || — || October 24, 2011 || Haleakala || Pan-STARRS || — || align=right | 2.6 km || 
|-id=959 bgcolor=#C2FFFF
| 491959 ||  || — || December 27, 2011 || Mount Lemmon || Mount Lemmon Survey || L4 || align=right | 6.7 km || 
|-id=960 bgcolor=#d6d6d6
| 491960 ||  || — || February 8, 2013 || Haleakala || Pan-STARRS || — || align=right | 2.8 km || 
|-id=961 bgcolor=#fefefe
| 491961 ||  || — || February 9, 2013 || Haleakala || Pan-STARRS || — || align=right data-sort-value="0.94" | 940 m || 
|-id=962 bgcolor=#fefefe
| 491962 ||  || — || September 4, 2011 || Haleakala || Pan-STARRS || V || align=right data-sort-value="0.64" | 640 m || 
|-id=963 bgcolor=#fefefe
| 491963 ||  || — || February 1, 2013 || Kitt Peak || Spacewatch || — || align=right data-sort-value="0.63" | 630 m || 
|-id=964 bgcolor=#fefefe
| 491964 ||  || — || January 17, 2013 || Mount Lemmon || Mount Lemmon Survey || — || align=right data-sort-value="0.75" | 750 m || 
|-id=965 bgcolor=#fefefe
| 491965 ||  || — || September 26, 2011 || Kitt Peak || Spacewatch || — || align=right data-sort-value="0.88" | 880 m || 
|-id=966 bgcolor=#fefefe
| 491966 ||  || — || January 20, 2013 || Kitt Peak || Spacewatch || — || align=right data-sort-value="0.90" | 900 m || 
|-id=967 bgcolor=#d6d6d6
| 491967 ||  || — || January 5, 2013 || Kitt Peak || Spacewatch || — || align=right | 2.8 km || 
|-id=968 bgcolor=#fefefe
| 491968 ||  || — || February 3, 2009 || Catalina || CSS || — || align=right data-sort-value="0.94" | 940 m || 
|-id=969 bgcolor=#fefefe
| 491969 ||  || — || February 10, 2013 || Haleakala || Pan-STARRS || — || align=right data-sort-value="0.86" | 860 m || 
|-id=970 bgcolor=#fefefe
| 491970 ||  || — || February 15, 2013 || Haleakala || Pan-STARRS || V || align=right data-sort-value="0.57" | 570 m || 
|-id=971 bgcolor=#fefefe
| 491971 ||  || — || February 15, 2013 || Haleakala || Pan-STARRS || — || align=right data-sort-value="0.73" | 730 m || 
|-id=972 bgcolor=#fefefe
| 491972 ||  || — || October 25, 2011 || Haleakala || Pan-STARRS || V || align=right data-sort-value="0.62" | 620 m || 
|-id=973 bgcolor=#FA8072
| 491973 ||  || — || March 13, 2005 || Kitt Peak || Spacewatch || — || align=right | 1.3 km || 
|-id=974 bgcolor=#E9E9E9
| 491974 ||  || — || October 15, 2007 || Catalina || CSS || — || align=right | 1.3 km || 
|-id=975 bgcolor=#fefefe
| 491975 ||  || — || October 25, 2011 || Haleakala || Pan-STARRS || V || align=right data-sort-value="0.69" | 690 m || 
|-id=976 bgcolor=#fefefe
| 491976 ||  || — || February 7, 2013 || Kitt Peak || Spacewatch || — || align=right data-sort-value="0.75" | 750 m || 
|-id=977 bgcolor=#fefefe
| 491977 ||  || — || March 18, 2002 || Kitt Peak || Spacewatch || MAS || align=right data-sort-value="0.65" | 650 m || 
|-id=978 bgcolor=#E9E9E9
| 491978 ||  || — || March 5, 2013 || Mount Lemmon || Mount Lemmon Survey || critical || align=right data-sort-value="0.75" | 750 m || 
|-id=979 bgcolor=#fefefe
| 491979 ||  || — || September 28, 2011 || Mount Lemmon || Mount Lemmon Survey || — || align=right data-sort-value="0.65" | 650 m || 
|-id=980 bgcolor=#fefefe
| 491980 ||  || — || March 6, 2013 || Haleakala || Pan-STARRS || — || align=right data-sort-value="0.78" | 780 m || 
|-id=981 bgcolor=#fefefe
| 491981 ||  || — || March 7, 2013 || Kitt Peak || Spacewatch || — || align=right data-sort-value="0.86" | 860 m || 
|-id=982 bgcolor=#fefefe
| 491982 ||  || — || February 22, 2010 || WISE || WISE || — || align=right | 1.3 km || 
|-id=983 bgcolor=#fefefe
| 491983 ||  || — || March 5, 2013 || Kitt Peak || Spacewatch || NYS || align=right data-sort-value="0.67" | 670 m || 
|-id=984 bgcolor=#d6d6d6
| 491984 Brunapontes ||  ||  || November 24, 2011 || Haleakala || Pan-STARRS || — || align=right | 3.2 km || 
|-id=985 bgcolor=#E9E9E9
| 491985 ||  || — || October 24, 2011 || Mount Lemmon || Mount Lemmon Survey || — || align=right | 1.3 km || 
|-id=986 bgcolor=#fefefe
| 491986 ||  || — || January 1, 2009 || Mount Lemmon || Mount Lemmon Survey || — || align=right data-sort-value="0.75" | 750 m || 
|-id=987 bgcolor=#fefefe
| 491987 ||  || — || March 8, 2013 || Haleakala || Pan-STARRS || — || align=right data-sort-value="0.78" | 780 m || 
|-id=988 bgcolor=#E9E9E9
| 491988 ||  || — || March 3, 2009 || Kitt Peak || Spacewatch || critical || align=right data-sort-value="0.59" | 590 m || 
|-id=989 bgcolor=#fefefe
| 491989 ||  || — || January 15, 2005 || Kitt Peak || Spacewatch || — || align=right data-sort-value="0.75" | 750 m || 
|-id=990 bgcolor=#fefefe
| 491990 ||  || — || February 21, 2013 || Haleakala || Pan-STARRS || — || align=right data-sort-value="0.81" | 810 m || 
|-id=991 bgcolor=#E9E9E9
| 491991 ||  || — || May 20, 2005 || Mount Lemmon || Mount Lemmon Survey || — || align=right data-sort-value="0.85" | 850 m || 
|-id=992 bgcolor=#fefefe
| 491992 ||  || — || September 23, 2011 || Haleakala || Pan-STARRS || — || align=right data-sort-value="0.75" | 750 m || 
|-id=993 bgcolor=#fefefe
| 491993 ||  || — || January 17, 2009 || Kitt Peak || Spacewatch || NYS || align=right data-sort-value="0.62" | 620 m || 
|-id=994 bgcolor=#C2FFFF
| 491994 ||  || — || September 15, 2007 || Mount Lemmon || Mount Lemmon Survey || L4 || align=right | 6.9 km || 
|-id=995 bgcolor=#fefefe
| 491995 ||  || — || March 8, 2013 || Haleakala || Pan-STARRS || NYS || align=right data-sort-value="0.60" | 600 m || 
|-id=996 bgcolor=#E9E9E9
| 491996 ||  || — || March 11, 2013 || Kitt Peak || Spacewatch || EUN || align=right | 1.1 km || 
|-id=997 bgcolor=#fefefe
| 491997 ||  || — || February 27, 2006 || Kitt Peak || Spacewatch || V || align=right data-sort-value="0.50" | 500 m || 
|-id=998 bgcolor=#E9E9E9
| 491998 ||  || — || March 26, 2009 || Kitt Peak || Spacewatch || — || align=right | 1.5 km || 
|-id=999 bgcolor=#E9E9E9
| 491999 ||  || — || March 13, 2013 || Mount Lemmon || Mount Lemmon Survey || — || align=right | 1.1 km || 
|-id=000 bgcolor=#E9E9E9
| 492000 ||  || — || September 17, 2006 || Kitt Peak || Spacewatch || — || align=right | 1.2 km || 
|}

References

External links 
 Discovery Circumstances: Numbered Minor Planets (490001)–(495000) (IAU Minor Planet Center)

0491